The Indo-European languages include some 449 (SIL estimate, 2018 edition) languages spoken by about or more than 3.5 billion people (roughly half of the world population). Most of the major languages belonging to language branches and groups of Europe, and western and southern Asia, belong to the Indo-European language family. Therefore, Indo-European is the biggest language family in the world by number of mother tongue speakers (but not by number of languages in which it is the 3rd or 5th biggest). Eight of the top ten biggest languages, by number of native speakers, are Indo-European. One of these languages, English, is the de facto World Lingua Franca with an estimate of over one billion second language speakers.

Each subfamily or linguistic branch in this list contains many subgroups and individual languages. Indo-European language family has 10 known branches or subfamilies, of which eight are living and two are extinct. The relation of Indo-European branches, how they are related to one another and branched from the ancestral proto-language is a matter of further research and not yet well known. There are some individual Indo-European languages that are unclassified within the language family, they are not yet classified in a branch and could be members of their own branch.

The 449 Indo-European languages identified in the SIL estimate, 2018 edition, are mostly living languages, however, if all the known extinct Indo-European languages are added, they number more than 800 or close to one thousand. This list includes all known Indo-European languages, living and extinct.

A distinction between a language and a dialect is not clear-cut and simple because there is, in many cases, several dialect continuums, transitional dialects and languages and also because there is no consensual standard to what amount of vocabulary, grammar, pronunciation and prosody differences there is a language or there is a dialect. (Mutual intelligibility can be a standard but there are closely related languages that are also mutual intelligible to some degree, even if it is an asymmetric intelligibility.) Because of this, in this list, several dialect groups and some individual dialects of languages are shown (in italics), especially if a language is or was spoken by a large number of people and over a big land area, but also if it has or had divergent dialects.

The ancestral population and language, Proto-Indo-Europeans that spoke Proto-Indo-European, estimated to have lived about 4500 BCE (6500 BP), at some time in the past, starting about 4000 BCE (6000 BP) expanded through migration and cultural influence. This started a complex process of population blend or population replacement, acculturation and language change of peoples in many regions of western and southern Eurasia.
This process gave origin to many languages and branches of this language family.

By the end of the second millennium BC Indo-European speakers were many millions and lived in a vast geographical area in most of western and southern Eurasia (including western Central Asia).

In the following two millennia the number of speakers of Indo-European languages increased even further.

By geographical area, Indo-European languages remained spoken in big land areas, although most of western Central Asia and Asia Minor was lost to another language family (mainly Turkic) due to Turkic expansion, conquests and settlement (after the middle of the first millennium AD and the beginning and middle of the second millennium AD respectively) and also to Mongol invasions and conquests (that changed Central Asia ethnolinguistic composition). Another land area lost to non-Indo-European languages was today's Hungary due to Magyar/Hungarian (Uralic language speakers) conquest and settlement.
However, in the second half of the second millennium AD, Indo-European languages expanded their territories to North Asia (Siberia), through Russian expansion, and North America, South America, Australia and New Zealand as the result of the age of European discoveries and European conquests through the expansions of the Portuguese, Spanish, French, English and the Dutch. (These peoples had the biggest continental or maritime empires in the world and their countries were major powers.)

The contact between different peoples and languages, especially as a result of European colonization, also gave origin to the many pidgins, creoles and mixed languages that are mainly based in Indo-European languages (many of which are spoken in island groups and coastal regions).

Ancestral (Proto-Indo-European)
Proto-Indo-European (extinct) (see also Proto-Indo-European homeland)
Early Proto-Indo-European (First phase of Indo-European)
Middle Proto-Indo-European ("Classical" Indo-European)
Late Proto-Indo-European (Last phase of indo-European as spoken language before splitting into several languages that originated in the regional dialects that diverged in time, and in space with Indo-European migrations, these languages were the direct ancestors of today's subfamilies or "branches" of descendant languages) (larger clades of Indo-European than the individual subfamilies or the way individual subfamilies are related to each other is still an unresolved issue)

Dating the split-offs of the main branches

Although all Indo-European languages descend from a common ancestor called Proto-Indo-European, the kinship between the subfamilies or branches (large groups of more closely related languages within the language family), that descend from other more recent proto-languages, is not the same because there are subfamilies that are closer or further, and they did not split-off at the same time, the affinity or kinship of Indo-European subfamilies or branches between themselves is still an unresolved and controversial issue and being investigated.

However, there is some consensus that Anatolian was the first group of Indo-European (branch) to split-off from all the others and Tocharian was the second in which that happened.

Using a mathematical analysis borrowed from evolutionary biology, Donald Ringe and Tandy Warnow propose the following tree of Indo-European branches:
Proto-Indo-European (PIE)
Pre-Anatolian (before 3500 BC)
Pre-Tocharian
Pre-Italic and Pre-Celtic (before 2500 BC)
Pre-Armenian and Pre-Greek (after 2500 BC)
Proto-Indo-Iranian (2000 BC)
Pre-Germanic and Pre-Balto-Slavic; proto-Germanic (500 BC)

David W. Anthony, following the methodology of Donald Ringe and Tandy Warnow, proposes the following sequence:
Proto-Indo-European (PIE)
Pre-Anatolian (4200 BC)
Pre-Tocharian (3700 BC)
Pre-Germanic (3300 BC)
Pre-Italic and Pre-Celtic (3000 BC)
Pre-Armenian (2800 BC)
Pre-Balto-Slavic (2800 BC)
Pre-Greek (2500 BC)
Proto-Indo-Iranian (2200 BC); split between Old Iranian and Old Indic 1800 BC

List of Indo-European protolanguages

The protolanguages that developed into the Indo-European languages

This is not a list of just Proto-Indo-European, but it also contains the protolanguages of Indo-European subfamilies

Pre-Proto-Indo-European
Proto-Indo-European (PIE) (Proper)
Early / Archaic PIE
Proto-Anatolian
Proto-Luwian / Proto-Luwic
Proto-Lydian
Proto-Palaic
Proto-Hittite
Middle PIE
Proto-Tocharian
Late PIE
Proto-Italic
Proto-Latino-Faliscan
Proto-Osco-Umbrian
Proto-Celtic
Proto-Continental-Celtic
Proto-Eastern-Celtic
Proto-Gaulish
Proto-Celtiberian
Proto-Gallaecian
Proto-Insular-Celtic
Proto-Brittonic
Proto-Goidelic
Proto-Armenian
Proto-Greek
Proto-Albanian
Proto-Germanic
Proto-Northwest-Germanic
Proto-Norse (Proto-North-Germanic)
Proto-West-Germanic
Proto-Elbe Germanic
Proto-Weser-Rhine Germanic
Proto-North Sea Germanic
Proto-East-Germanic
Proto-Balto-Slavic
Proto-Baltic
Proto-Western-Baltic
Proto-Eastern-Baltic
Proto-Slavic
Proto-East-Slavic
Proto-Ruthenian-Russian (Proto-Southwest-Northeast East Slavic)
Proto-Ruthenian
Proto-Russian
Proto-Novgorodian-Pskovian (Proto-Northwest East Slavic)
Proto-West-South Slavic
Proto-West-Slavic
Proto-Lechtic
Proto-Sorbian (Proto-Elbe-Serbian)
Proto-Czech-Slovak
Proto-South-Slavic
Proto-Western South Slavic
Proto-Slovene
Proto-Shtokavian (Proto-Serbo-Croatian)
Proto-Eastern South Slavic
Old-Slavonic (Proto-Slavic Bulgarian-Slavic Macedonian)
Proto-Indo-Iranian
Proto-Iranian
Proto-Eastern-Iranian
Proto-Northeast-Iranian (North Eastern Iranian)
Proto-Scythian
Proto-Southeast-Iranian (South Eastern Iranian)
Proto-Sogdo-Bactrian
Proto-Western-Iranian
Proto-Northwest-Iranian (North Western Iranian)
Proto-Southwest-Iranian (South Western Iranian)
Proto-Nuristani
Proto-Indo-Aryan
Sanskrit
Prakrit
Proto-Shauraseni
Proto-Sindhi
Proto-Punjabi
Proto-Western-Hindi
Proto-Magadhi
Proto-Bihari
Proto-Bengali-Assamese
Proto-Odia
Proto-Maharashtri
Proto-Marathi-Konkani
Proto-Sinhalese-Maldivian

The list below follows Donald Ringe and Tandy Warnow classification tree for Indo-European branches.

Anatolian languages (all extinct)

Proto-Anatolian
Hittite (Nesitic/Central)
Hittite (Nesite) (𒉈𒅆𒇷 – Nesili)
Cappadocian? (also known as Leucosyrian, was spoken in Cappadocia and West Pontus)
Luwic (Southern)
Luwian
Aštanuwa Luwian / Ištanuwa Luwian (written in Cuneiform Luwian)
Kizzuwadna / Kizzuwatna Luwian (written in Cuneiform Luwian)
Cilician
Empire Luwian (written in Cuneiform Luwian and Hieroglyphic Luwian)
Iron Age Luwian
Cataonian (possibly assimilated by Cappadocian at Classical Age)
Commagenian?
Isaurian
Lycaonian
Southwest
Carian
Lelegian? (language of the Leleges)
Lycian (𐊗𐊕𐊐𐊎𐊆𐊍𐊆 – Trm̃mili = Trəmmili (m̃ = əm))
Milyan ("Lycian B")
Pisido-Sidetian
Pisidian
Sidetic
Pamphylian (Non-Hellenic)
Western Anatolian? (related to, but not part of, Luwic)
Lydian / Maeonian (𐤮𐤱𐤠𐤭𐤣𐤸𐤯𐤦𐤳 – Śfardẽtis)
Palaic (Northern)
Palaic

Tocharian languages (Agni-Kuči languages) (all extinct)

Proto-Agni-Kuči ("Proto-Tocharian")
North-Tocharian (it was originally spoken in many areas of the Tarim Basin and Turpan Depression) (according to several linguists the languages are inaccurately called "Tocharian" in a misnomer because they view "Tocharian" as a name synonymous with Bactrian, an Iranian language, however there are other linguists who think that the name was correctly applied and only later would Tocharians replace their original language with an Iranian one.)
Agnean (Tocharian A) (also called Turfanian, East Tocharian) (Agni / Ārśi) (its main centres were Agni, in today's Yanqi or Karasahr, in the Yanqi Hui Autonomous County, and Turpan)
Kuchean (Tocharian B) (also called West Tocharian) (Kuśiññe /  Kučiññe) (its main centre was Kucha or Kuqa)
South Tocharian (on the southern and southeastern rim of the Tarim Basin)
Kroränian (Tocharian C) (possible) (also called Krorainic, Lolanisch or South Tocharian) (it was the possible substrate language for the Kroraina or Niya Prakrit, an Indo-Aryan language spoken as administrative language in the Shanshan kingdom) (its main centre was Kroraina, today's Loulan, part of the Shanshan, Kroraina or Loulan kingdom)

Italic languages

Proto-Italic (extinct)
Osco-Umbrian languages (Sabellic languages) (all extinct)
Umbrian
Umbrian (Umbrian Proper) (was spoken by the Umbrians)
Sabine (was spoken by the Sabines in Sabina region)
Hernican (was spoken by the Hernici)
Marsian (was spoken by the Marsi, an Italic people, in Marruvium region)
South Picene (Old Sabellic)
Volscian (was spoken by the Volsci)
Oscan
Oscan (Oscan Proper) (was spoken by the Oscans)
Marrucinian (was spoken by the Marrucini)
Paelignian (was spoken by the Paeligni)
Sidicinian (was spoken by the Sidicini)
Pre-Samnite (ancient language spoken in southern Campania, in Italy, before Samnite conquest)
Unclassified (within Italic)
Aequian (extinct; certainly Italic but unclassified) (was spoken by Aequi)
Vestinian (extinct; certainly Italic but unclassified) (was spoken by the Vestini)
Latino-Faliscan languages
Faliscan (extinct) (was spoken by the Faliscans in Ager Faliscus)
Capenate
Latin (Latina/Lingua Latina) (Lingua franca, High culture language and de facto Official language of the Roman Republic and the Roman Empire, Classical language in the western half of the Roman Empire, see Greek East and Latin West, and of the Western Roman Empire, High culture language of Western Europe for two thousand years, traditional sacred or liturgical language of the Christian Catholic Church/Roman Catholic church for almost two millennia) (origin in Latium Vetus, part of today's Lazio region, West Central Italy) (extinct as first language or mother tongue but always known, continuously learned, spoken and written along many generations)
Old Latin (Early Latin / Archaic Latin) (Prisca Latina / Prisca Latinitas) (extinct)
Classical Latin (LINGVA LATINA – Lingua Latina) (extinct)
Latium Latin (intra Latium) (Latin that was spoken by the original speakers of Latin in Latium Vetus, Latium)
Roman Latin
Rural Roman Latin (Latin dialect of Ager Romanus, rural areas of Latium)
Urban Roman Latin (Latin dialect of ancient Rome city, Roma Urbs, itself)
Standard Latin (Lingua Latina Exemplar)
Vulgar Latin / Colloquial Latin / Common Latin (Sermō vulgāris)
Lanuvian (it was spoken in Lanuvium, today's Lanuvio, in Lazio, west central Italy)
Praenestinian (it was spoken in Praeneste, today's Palestrina, in Lazio, west central Italy)
Provincial Latin (extra Latium) (Latin that was spoken by Romanized peoples in the provinces of the Roman Empire)
Northern Latin/Continental Latin
Western Latin
Italic-Latin (Latin that was spoken by the Italo-Romans, non-latin italic Romanized populations)
Gallo-Hispanic Latin
Gallic Latin (Latin that was spoken by the Gallo-Romans)
Cisalpine Gallic (in most of today's Northern Italy)
Transalpine/Gallic and Aquitanian Latin
Britannic Latin / British Latin (Not British Romance) (Latin that was spoken by the Romano-Britons)
Hibernian Latin
Rhaetian Latin
Hispanic Latin (Latin that was spoken by the Hispano-Romans)
Eastern Latin
Illyrian Latin (north of the Jireček Line) (Latin that was spoken by the Illyro-Romans)
Pannonian Latin (Not Pannonian Romance)
Dacian Latin (north of the Jireček Line) (Latin that was spoken by the Daco-Romans)
Thracian Latin (south of the Jireček Line) (Latin that was spoken by the Thraco-Romans) (may have influenced Aromanian)
Greco-Latin (Spoken by Roman Diaspora in Greece)
Southern Latin (retention of archaic features in the periphery of the Latin speaking world)
Insular Latin (Not Insular Romance) (Latin that was spoken by the insular populations of Corsica and Sardinia)
Corsican Latin
Sardinian Latin
African Latin (Not African Romance) (West North Africa, in many regions of today's Maghreb) (Latin that was spoken by the Roman Africans in North Africa, especially in the Africa province, the origin of the name "Africa" that was later applied to the whole continent)
Latin Sociolects (most provinces)
Imperial Latin (Sociolect used by ruling class Romans)
Judeo-Latin (Judæo-Latin / La‘az/ Ebraico-Latino) (לועז – Lo`ez / La'az) (Sociolect used by Roman Jews)
Serf Latin (Sociolect used by Roman Serfs)
Out of the Empire Latin
Germanic-Latin
Slavic-Latin
Late Latin (Latina / Lingua Latina) (last phase of Latin as a first language or mother tongue and written Latin of Late Antiquity)
Medieval Latin (Lingua Latina) (Latin after stopped being spoken as first language or mother tongue)
Broad Medieval Latin
Ecclesiastical Latin (Church Latin / Liturgical Latin) (Lingua Latina Ecclesiastica)
Hiberno-Latin / Hisperic Latin (Latin spoken and written by Ireland's Celtic Christianity or Insular Christianity culture, a part of the Catholic Christianity in the Medieval Christianity time, especially the Irish monks)
Renaissance Latin
Baroque Latin (French Standard Latin)
New Latin (Lingua Latina Nova / Latina Nova)
Contemporary Latin (Latinitas viva)
Late Vulgar Latin (Sermo Vulgaris / Lingua Romanica – "Roman language" / "Romanic language", the origin of the term "Romance" applied to the languages) (Vulgar Latin, especially Late Vulgar Latin is synonymous with Proto-Romance or Common Romance, Latin through its variant Vulgar Latin, is the Proto-language or common ancestor language of Romance or New Latin languages or Neo-Latin languages) (Latin, mainly including its variant, Vulgar Latin, had several regional dialects that over time developed towards separate but closely related Romance/New Latin languages languages) (extinct)
Romance / New Latin / Neo Latin (languages that evolved from Latin regional dialects that over time developed towards separate but closely related languages)
Continental Romance / Northern Romance (another alternative classification of the main Romance languages groups is the Western vs. Eastern Romance languages split by the La Spezia-Rimini Line)
Italo-Western languages (dialect continuum)
Italo-Dalmatian languages (dialect continuum)
Italian (in the sense of a group of sister languages forming a dialect continuum)
Old Italian (extinct)
Central Italian / Middle Italian (Italiano Centrale / Italiano Mediano)
Latian (Laziale) (spoken in most part of the Lazio region) (roughly in the region corresponding to the Old Latium)
Romanesco (Romanesco / Romano) (spoken roughly in the city of Rome, genealogical and geographical descendant from popular Roman Latin)
Central-Northern Latian / Ciociaro (spoken in the old Province of Rome, outside the capital, and the northern areas of the Provinces of Frosinone and Latina, roughly in the western Ciociara historical region)
Sabino (Sabino) (spoken in the Province of Rieti and L'Aquila)
Aquilano (also known as Cicolano-Reatino-Aquilano)
Arseolano / Sublacense
Tagliacozzano
Umbrian (Romance Umbrian) (spoken in Umbria)
Northern Umbrian
Viterbese / Tuscia dialect (Tuscia, northern part of the wider Latium)
Southern Umbrian
Marchegian (Marchigiano Proper) (Marchigià) (spoken in the central part of Marche)
Maceratese-Fermano
Anconitano
Southern Italian (Southern Italian - Far Southern Italian]])
Southern Italian Proper / Neapolitan (Napulitano – ’O Nnapulitano) ("Neapolitan" in a broad sense and synonymous of Southern Continental Italian)
Southern Laziale (southern part of the province of Frosinone: Sora, Lazio, Cassino; southern part of Province of Latina: Gaeta, Formia) (Central Italian substrate)
Abruzzese and Southern Marchigiano (Central Italian substrate)
Southern Marchigiano (Ascoli Piceno) 
Teramano (Province of Teramo; northern Province of Pescara: Atri, Abruzzo)
Abruzzese Eastern Adriatico (Southern Province of Pescara: Penne, Francavilla al Mare; Province of Chieti)
Western Abruzzese (southern part of Province of L'Aquila: Marsica, Avezzano, Pescina, Sulmona, Pescasseroli, Roccaraso)
Molisan (in Molise region) (Central Italian substrate)
Campanian
Neapolitan (Napulitano / ’O Nnapulitano) (in a narrow sense, the language spoken in Naples) (Neapolitan proper: Naples and the Gulf of Naples)
Beneventano (in Benevento area)
Irpino (Province of Avellino)
Arianese
Cilentano / Cilentano Settentrionale (Cilentan / Northern Cilentan) (most of Province of Salerno, includes Vallo della Lucania, except for the far south) (in most part of Cilento)
Apulian (Pugliese) (in Apulia)
Dauno / Dauno-Appenninico (western Province of Foggia: Foggia, Bovino)
Garganico (eastern Province of Foggia: Gargano)
Barese / Apulo-Barese (Province of Bari; western Province of Taranto, includes Tarantino dialect; and part of the western Province of Brindisi)
Tarantino (in Taranto city and region)
Lucanian / Basilicatan - Northern Calabrian (northern Province of Potenza: Potenza, Melfi) (in Basilicata, ancient Lucania, and northern Calabria)
Northeastern Lucanian (Province of Matera: Matera)
Central Lucanian (Province of Potenza: Lagonegro, Pisticci, Laurenzana) (The northern "Lausberg area"; archaic forms of Lucanian with Balkan Romance vocalism, "Romanian like" language area described by Heinrich Lausberg (1939))
Castelmezzano
Southern Lucanian (The southern "Lausberg area"; archaic forms of Lucanian with Sardinian vocalism, "Sardinian like" language area described by Heinrich Lausberg (1939)) (It lies between Calabria and Basilicata – Chiaromonte, Oriolo)
Northern Calabrian
Cosentino (Province of Cosenza: Rossano, Diamante, Castrovillari) (With transitional dialects to south of Cosenza, where they give way to Sicilian group dialects)
Extreme Southern Italian / Far Southern Italian (Siculo-Calabrian) (also called "Sicilian", in a broad sense)
Southern Calabrian
Reggino (in the Metropolitan City of Reggio Calabria, especially on the Scilla–Bova line, and excluding the areas of Locri and Rosarno which represent the first isogloss which divide Sicilian from the continental varieties)
Sicilian / Sicilian Proper (Sicilianu / Lu Sicilianu)
Western Sicilian (Palermitano in Palermo, Trapanese in Trapani, Central-Western Agrigentino in Agrigento)
Central Metafonetic (in the central part of Sicily that includes some areas of the provinces of Caltanissetta, Messina, Enna, Palermo and Agrigento)
Southeast Metafonetic (in the Province of Ragusa and the adjoining area within the Province of Syracuse)
Ennese (in the Province of Enna)
Eastern Non-Metafonetic (in the area including the Metropolitan City of Catania, the second largest city in Sicily, as Catanese, and the adjoining area within the Province of Syracuse)
Messinese (in the Metropolitan City of Messina, the third largest city in Sicily)
Eoliano (in the Aeolian Islands)
Pantesco (on the island of Pantelleria)
Cilentano Meridionale (Far Southern Cilentan) (area with Sicilian vocalism) (in far southern Cilento)
Salentino (Salentinu) (spoken in Salento peninsula, far southeastern Apulia region)
Manduriano (in Manduria)
Old Tuscan (Etruscan substrate)
Tuscan (Toscano) (Etruscan substrate)
Northern Tuscan
Florentine (Fiorentino) (the main dialect of Florence, Chianti and the Mugello region, also spoken in Prato and along the river Arno as far as the city of Fucecchio) (basis of Modern Standard Italian but not identical, Standard Italian is much more latinized) 
Italian (Italiano / Lingua Italiana) / Standard Italian (mainly based on the Fiorentino dialect of Tuscan but not identical and much more latinized)
Tuscany Regional Italian (Tuscan substrate) (regional variety of Italian, not to be confused with the substrate language)
Central Italy, Southern Italy and Sicily Regional Italian (Central Italian, Neapolitan and Sicilian substrates) (regional variety of Italian, not to be confused with the substrate languages)
Northern Italy Regional Italian (Gallo-Italian and Veneto substrates) (regional variety of Italian, not to be confused with the substrate languages)
Sardinia Regional Italian (Sardinian substrate) (regional variety of Italian, not to be confused with the substrate language or languages)
Pistoiese (spoken in the city of Pistoia and nearest zones, some linguists include this dialect in Fiorentino)
Lucchese (spoken in Lucca and nearby hills: Lucchesia)
Pesciatino / Valdinievolese (spoken in the Valdinievole zone, in the cities of Pescia and Montecatini Terme) (some linguists include this dialect in Lucchese)
Versiliese (spoken in the historical area of Versilia)
Viareggino (spoken in Viareggio and vicinity)
Pisano-Livornese (spoken in Pisa, in Livorno, and the vicinity, and along the coast from Livorno to Cecina)
Southern Tuscan
Aretino-Chianaiolo (spoken in Arezzo and the Valdichiana)
Grossetano (spoken in Grosseto and along the southern coast)
Elbano (spoken on the island of Elba)
Corsican (Corsu / Lingua Corsa) (Paleo-Corsican substrate)
Northern Corsican
Capraiese (in Capraia Island)
Cismontano Capocorsino
Cismontano
Northern Cismontano
Southern Cismontano
Transitional Cismontano-Oltramontano
Oltramontano
Southern Corsican
Oltramontano Sartenese
Corsican-Sardinian (languages of Corsican origin with strong Sardinian substrate)
Gallurese (Gadduresu) (divergent enough from Corsican to be considered a separate language, although closely related to it)
Castellanese
Sassarese (Sassaresu / Turritanu) (divergent enough from Corsican to be considered a separate language, although closely related to it, has a stronger Sardinian substrate)
Venetian (Romance Venetian) (Vèneto / Łéngoa vèneta) (old language of the Venice Republic and ruled territories in the Adriatic and Ionian Seas)
Central Venetian (spoken in Padua, Vicenza, Polesine)
Padovan (in Padua region)
Rodigino (in Rovigo region)
Vicentino (in Vicenza region)
Alto Vicentino
Sea Venetian (Veneto da Mar) (spoken in northern and eastern coastal areas of the Adriatic Sea)
Lagoon Venetian (in the Venetian Lagoon)
Venetian  (spoken in and around Venice)
Chioggia subdialect (Chioggioto) (spoken in Chioggia)
Colonial Venetian (Veneto Coloniale) (spoken in enclaves in the Friuli areas and alongside Friulian, in Aquileia, Palmanuova, Udine, Gorizia and other cities)
Eastern Coastal Venetian / Istro-Dalmatian Venetian (spoken in several islands and areas of the Adriatic Sea eastern coast) (spoken by majorities in Grado and Trieste, by minorities in Fiume or Rijeka and parts of Istria and Dalmatia)
Triestine (in Trieste) (it has Friulan substrate of the Old Tergestine dialect)
Istrian Venetian (not to be confused with the Istriot language) (in parts of western coastal Istria)
Fiuman - in Fiume (Rijeka)
Dalmatian Venetian (not to be confused with Dalmatian language) (in parts of Dalmatia) - it was spoken in the islands of Crepsa (Cres), Veglia (Krk), Arba (Rab) and coastal cities of Dalmatia such as Zara (Zadar), Traù (Trogir), Spalato (Split), Ragusa (Dubrovnik) and Cattaro (Kotor) alongside with Dalmatian language, also a Romance language, and being influenced by it)
Corfiot Italian (spoken by the Corfiot Italians in Corfu or Kerkyra island, western Greece) (extinct)
Western Venetian
Veronese (spoken in Verona region)
Eastern Trentino (spoken in eastern Trentino province)
Northern Venetian - Eastern Venetian
Northern Venetian / North-Central Destra Piave (from Piave river right banks, to the west of Piave, a river that flows from north towards south) (western Province of Treviso and southern Province of Belluno)
Trevigiano (in and around Treviso)
Eastern Venetian / Northern Sinistra Piave (from Piave river left banks, to the east of Piave, a river that flows from north towards south) (eastern Province of Treviso and most of the Province of Pordenone)
Pordenonese
Bellunese
Northern Venetian diaspora dialects
Pontine Marshes Venetian (in parts of the Pontine Marshes, or Agro Pontino, southern Lazio, formed by migration of Venetian speakers to the Pontine Marshes in the middle 20th Century, different from native Southern Laziale)
Arborea Venetian (in Arborea, Sardinia island)
Slavonia Venetian (small enclaves in Slavonia, eastern Croatia)
Talian (spoken in Antônio Prado, Entre Rios, Santa Catarina and Toledo, Paraná, among other southern Brazilian cities, Brazil)
Chipilo Venetian (Cipilegno) (spoken in Chipilo, Mexico)
Italkian (Judeo-Italian) (ג'יודו-איטאליאנו – Giudeo-Italiano / איטלקית – 'Italqit) (La'az - לעז) (traditionally spoken by the Italian Jews)
Extreme Southern Italian Italkian 
Judeo-Salentine (Giudeo-Salentino) (in Salento Peninsula, southeast Apulia)
Salentine Judeo-Corfiot (Giudeo-Corfioto Salentino) (in Corfu or Kerkyra island) (extinct)
Central Italian Italkian
Judeo-Roman (Giudeo-Romanesco) (from Rome) (spoken by the Jews of Rome, one of the oldest Jewish communities in Europe)
Bagitto (Giudeo-Livornese) (from Livorno or Leghorn)
Judeo-Florentine (Giudeo-Fiorentino, Iodiesco) (from Florence)
Judeo-Venetian Italkian (Giudeo-Veneziano) (from Venice)
Venetian Judeo-Corfiot (Giudeo-Corfioto Veneziano) (in Corfu or Kerkyra island) (extinct)
Gallo-Italic Italkian
Judeo-Reggian (Giudeo-Reggiano) (from the region of Reggio Emilia in Emilia-Romagna)
Judeo-Modenan (Giudeo-Modenese) (from Modena)
Judeo-Ferraran (Giudeo-Ferrarese) (from Ferrara)
Judeo-Mantuan (Giudeo-Mantovano) (from Mantua)
Judaeo-Piedmontese (Giudeo-Piemontese) (from the region of Piedmont) (extinct)
Illyro-Roman / Dalmatian (Transitional Western-Eastern Romance)
Istriot (Bumbaro / Vallese / Rovignese / Sissanese / Fasanese / Gallesanese) (no common self name, autonym, for the language) (not to be confused with the Istrian dialect of the Venetian language)
Bumbaro (in Vodnjan, Istria, coastal western Croatia)
Vallese (in Bale, Istria, coastal western Croatia)
Rovignese (in Rovinj, Istria, coastal western Croatia)
Sissanese (in Šišan, Istria, coastal western Croatia)
Fasanese (in Fažana, Istria, coastal western Croatia)
Gallesanese (in Galižana, Istria, coastal western Croatia)
Dalmatian (Romance Dalmatian) (Dalmato / Langa Dalmata) (extinct) (not to be confused with the Dalmatian dialect of the Venetian language)
Northern Dalmatian
Vegliot (was spoken in the island of Krk – Vikla, Veglia, coastal Croatia)
Cres (was spoken in the island of Kres – Crepsa, coastal Croatia)
Rab (was spoken in the island of Rab – Arba, coastal Croatia)
Zadar (Jadera) (was spoken in Zadar, coastal Croatia)
Trogir (Tragur, Traù) (was spoken in Trogir, coastal Croatia)
Spalato (Split; Spalato) (was spoken in Split region, coastal Croatia)
Southern Dalmatian
Ragusa (Dubrovnik; Raugia, Ragusa) (was spoken in the old Republic of Ragusa, today's Dubrovnik region, coastal Croatia)
Cattaro (was spoken in Kotor, southwestern coastal Montenegro)
Western Romance languages (dialect continuum)
Gallo-Hispanic/Gallo-Iberian
Gallo-Romance languages (dialect continuum)
Gallo-Italic (Cisalpine Romance)
Emilian-Romagnol (Emiliân-Rumagnôl / Langua Emiglièna-Rumagnôla)
Romagnol (Rumagnôl) (Central Italian substrate)
Southern Romagnol (North Marchigiano Romagnol) Pesaro-Urbino Romagnol
San Marino Romagnol (Sammarinese)
Central Romagnol
Forlivese (in Forli)
Northern Romagnol
Emilian (Emigliân)
Bolognese (spoken in the Metropolitan City of Bologna and in around Castelfranco Emilia, Modena)
Ferrarese (spoken in the Province of Ferrara, southern Veneto, and Comacchio)
Modenese (spoken in the Province of Modena, although Bolognese is more widespread in the Castelfranco area. In the northern part of the province of Modena, the lowlands around the town of Mirandola, a Mirandolese sub-dialect of Modenese is spoken)
Reggiano (spoken in the Province of Reggio Emilia, although the northern parts, such as Guastalla, Luzzara and Reggiolo, of the province are not part of this group and closer to Mantovano)
Parmigiano (spoken in the Province of Parma. Those from the area refer to the Parmigiano spoken outside of Parma as Arioso or Parmense, although today's urban and rural dialects are so mixed that only a few speak the original. The language spoken in Casalmaggiore in the Province of Cremona to the north of Parma is closely related to Parmigiano)
Piacentino (spoken west of the River Taro in the Province of Piacenza and on the border with the province of Parma. The variants of Piacentino are strongly influenced by Lombard, Piedmontese, and Ligurian)
Carrarese (spoken in Carrara)
Lunigiano (spoken in Lunigiana, in almost all of the Province of Massa and Carrara in northwestern Tuscany, and a good portion of the Province of La Spezia in eastern Liguria)
Massese (mixed with some Tuscan features)
Casalasco (spoken in Cremona, Lombardy)
Transitional Emilian-Lombard
Lombard-Emilian
Mantuan (Mantovano) (spoken in all but the very north of the Province of Mantua in Lombardy. It has a strong Lombard influence)
Vogherese (Pavese-Vogherese) (spoken in the Province of Pavia in Lombardy, it is closely related phonetically and morphologically to Piacentino, it is also akin to Tortonese)
Lombard (Romance Lombard) (Lombard / Lumbaart) (Italo-Roman people of today's Northern Italy, who called their own language simply as "Latin" or "Roman" / "Romance", later adopted the adjective "Lombard" – "Lombard" / "Lumbaart" for the language based on the name of most of their ruling elite – the Lombards, a Germanic people that conquered most of the ancient Roman province called Gallia Cisalpina, most of today's Northern Italy and after that most of Italy, and founded the Lombard Kingdom)
Eastern Lombard (Lombard)
Northern Cremonese (in northern Cremona Province)
Bressano / Bresciano (in Brescia Province)
Bergamasco (Bergamàsch) (in Bergamo Province)
Western Trentino (in west Trentino, west Trento Province)
Eastern Trentino (in east Trentino, east Trento Province) (influenced by Venetian)
Western Lombard (Lombard / Lumbaart)
Milanese (Milanés) / Meneghin (Macromilanese)
Brianzöö (Lombardo-prealpino occidentale – macromilanese)
Monzese
Canzés (in Canzo)
Bustocco-Legnanese
Comasco-Lecchese (Lombardo-prealpino occidentale)
Comasco
Laghée
Intelvese
Vallassinese
Lecchese
Valsassinese
Varesino / Bosin (Lombardo-Prealpino Occidentale)
Ticinese (Lombardo Alpino)
Ossolano
Alpine Lombard (Lombardo alpino, strong influence from Eastern Lombard language)
Valtellinese
Chiavennasco
Southwestern Lombard (Basso-Lombardo Occidentale)
Pavese (in Pavia area) (strong influence from Emiliano-Romagnolo language)
Lodigiano
Cremunés (in Cremona area) (strong influence from Emiliano-Romagnolo language)
Spasell (spoken until the 19th century by inhabitants of Vallassina as a cant or secret language) (by its divergent vocabulary it could be considered its own language derived from Lombard) (extinct) (similar to the case of Minderico in Portugal, a cant or secret language derived from Portuguese but not mutual intelligible with it because of divergent vocabulary)
Transitional Lombard-Piemontese
Novarese (Nuares) (Lombardo-Prealpino Occidentale – Macromilanese) (in Novara area)
Piedmontese (Piemontèis)
Eastern Piemontese
Western Piemontese
Torinese-Cuneese
Canavesano
Ligurian (Romance Ligurian) (Ligure / Lengua Ligure / Zeneize)
Eastern Ligurian
Genoese Ligurian (Central Ligurian) (Zeneize)
Oltregiogo Ligurian
Intemelian-Alpine Ligurian
Intemelio
Monégasque (Munegascu) (spoken in Monaco)
Alpine Ligurian (considered transitional dialects between Ligurian and Occitan)
Brigasc (in Briga Alta and La Brigue area)
Pignasc (in Pigna, Liguria)
Triorasc (in Triora, Liguria)
Royasc (Roiasc) (considered a transitional dialect between Ligurian and Occitan)
Gallo-Italic of Basilicata
Gallo-Italic of Sicily
Gallo-Rhaetian
Rhaeto-Romance
Friulian / Friulan (Furlan / Lenghe Furlane / Marilenghe) (spoken by the Friulians in Friuli, Northeastern Italy)
Western
Central
Northern
Southeastern
Old Tergestine (extinct) (it was spoken in Trieste before being replaced by a dialect of Venetian)
Ladin (Ladin / Lingaz Ladin)
Trentinian Group of the Sella (Moenat, Brach, and Cazet) (spoken in Fassa Valley)
Agordino Group of the Sella (Agordo and Valle del Biois, Fodom, Rocchesano)
Athesian Group of the Sella (Gherdëina, Badiot and Maró)
Ampezzan Group (spoken in Cortina d'Ampezzo – Anpezo)
Cadorino Group (spoken in Cadore and Comelico)
Låger / Nortades Group
Fornes (in Forni di Sopra and Forni di Sotto)
Nones and Solandro Group (spoken in Western Trentino, in Non Valley, Val di Sole, Val di Peio, Val di Rabbi, and part of Val Rendena)
Romansh (Rumantsch / Rumàntsch / Romauntsch / Romontsch)
Tuatschin
Sursilvan
Sutsilvan
Surmiran
Putèr
Vallader
Jauer
Oïl (Northern Gallo-Romance) (Langues d'Oïl) (dialect continuum) (Gallo-Roman people of today's Northern France, who called their own language simply as "Latin" or "Roman"/"Romans" or even "Langue d'Oïl", later adopted the adjective "French" – "François"/"Français" for the language based on the name of most of their ruling elite – the Franks, a Germanic people that conquered most of the ancient Roman province called Gallia and founded the Frankish Empire)
Southeast Oïl (transitional between Gallo-Italic and North Gallo-Romance (Oïl) and also South Gallo-Romance (Oc), although closer to the North Gallo-Romance (Oïl) languages) (archaic North Gallo-Romance language, with some features transitional to South Gallo-Romance language – Occitan) (dialect continuum)
Arpitan (Arpetan / Francoprovençâl / Patouès) (Arpetan name is derived from the name of the Alps in the language – Arpes)
Piedmont Valleys Arpitan
Valdôtain (Arpitan of Aosta Valley)
Savoyard
Vaudois
Dauphinois
Lyonnais
Jurassien (Southern Franc-Comtois)
Faetar-Cellese (Arpitan of Apulia) (Faetar-Cigliàje) (an Arpitan enclave in the south of the Italian Peninsula
Old French (Franceis / François / Romanz) (extinct) (Gallo-Roman people of today's Northern France, who called their own language simply as "Latin" or "Roman"/"Romance" or even "Langue d'Oïl", later adopted the adjective "French" – "François"/"Français" for the language based on the name of most of their ruling elite – the Franks, a Germanic people that conquered most of the ancient Roman province called Gallia and founded the Frankish Empire)
Middle French (François/Franceis)
Burgundian (Oïl Burgundian / Burgundian Gallo-Romance)
Burgundian-Morvandeau (Bregognon)
Burgundian proper
Morvandeau
Brionnais-Charolais
Frainc-Comtois/Jurassien (Frainc-Comtou/Jurassien)
Central Oïl
North Central Oïl
Francien / Francilien (Île de France Langue d'Oïl)
French (Français / Langue Française) (in the sense of group of dialects forming a dialect continuum)
European French
French of France / France French
Île de France French
Parisian (basis of Modern Standard French but not identical)
Standard French (Common Supradialectal French)
Meridional French / Francitan (Occitan substrate and strongly influenced by it)
Belgian French
Swiss French
Aostan French
Jersey Legal French
American French / French of North America
Canadian French
Acadian French (Français Acadien)
Chiac
Louisiana French (Cajun French) (Français Louisianais) (divergent enough to be considered a separate although closely related language to the other American French varieties) (Cadien > Cajun; palatalization of di [dj] as dj [dʒ] sounded almost as Cajun in English hence the name)
Transitional Acadian-Québec French
Brayon French
Québec French (Français Québécois)
"Old" dialects
Quebec City dialect (Québec city and surroundings)
Rimouski dialect
Western-Central dialects
Central dialect
Western dialect (includes Montreal and surroundings)
Montreal dialect
Joual
Ontario French (not an expatriate dialect)
Muskrat French/Detroit River French Canadian
Maritime dialects
"New" dialects
Eastern dialect
Northern dialect
Gaspésie dialect (spoken in Gaspésie)
Expatriate dialects
New England French (Français de Nouvelle-Angleterre) (spoken in inland Maine State, parts of New Hampshire)
Manitoba French (spoken in some enclaves in Manitoba Province, Central Canada)
Missouri French / Illinois Country French ("Paw-Paw French") (Français du Pays des Illinois / Français Vincennois / Cahok / Français du Missouri) (nearly extinct)
Newfoundland French (Français Terre-Neuvien]]) (community of speakers came directly from France in the late 1800s and early 1900s, it is not Québécois or of Québécois descend) (nearly extinct)
Frenchville French (Français de Frenchville]]) (community of speakers came directly from France in the 1800s, it is not Québécois or of Québécois descend) (nearly extinct)
Saint-Barthélemy French (Patois Saint-Barth) (community of speakers came directly from France, although geographically in the Caribbean, in Saint-Barthélemy island in the French West Indies it is not a Caribbean French dialect)
Caribbean French
Haitian French (Français Haïtien) (not to be confused with Haitian Creole, a French-based Creole language)
West Indian French / Caribbean French
Guianese French
Oceania French
New Caledonian French (Caldoche)
African French / Sub-Saharan African French (Français Africain)
Maghreb French / North African French
Indian French (Français Indien)
South East Asian French
Loire North Central Langue d'Oil (non francien north central Oïl, non-standard dialects of French, true dialects of French )
Orleanais (Orléanais)
Blésois
Tourangeau
South Central Oïl (close and sister languages of French in the Central Oïl dialect continuum) (South Gallo-Romance Occitan substrate)
Berrichon (Berrichonne)
Oïl Bourbonnais (Bourbonnais d'Oïl)
East Oïl
Champenois (Champaignat)
Western Champenois
Eastern Champenois
Lorrain (Lorrain / Gaumais)
Central Lorrain
Western Lorrain
Eastern Lorrain
Welche
Armorican (Western Oïl)
Manceau
Percheron
Sarthois
Mayennais
South Norman (south of Joret line)
Angevin (Angevin)
Gallo (Galo)
Frankish (Northern Oïl)
Northwest Oïl (archaic North Gallo-Romance language, less palatalization in comparison with Central, Eastern and Western Oïl languages) (north of Joret line)
Old Norman (Old Romance Norman)
Norman (Romance Norman) (Normaund)
Continental/Mainland dialects
Cauchois (spoken in the Pays de Caux)
Augeron (spoken in the Pays d'Auge)
Cotentinais (spoken in Cotentin)
Norman Islands / Channel Island dialects
Auregnais / Aoeur'gnaeux (extinct)
Guernésiais / Dgèrnésiais
Jèrriais
Sercquiais (nearly extinct)
Anglo-Norman / Anglo-Norman French (Norman) (significantly contributed to Middle English vocabulary, many English words of Latin origin came through Anglo-Norman) (extinct)
North Oïl Proper
Picard (Picard / Chti / Chtimi / Rouchi / Roubaignot) (archaic North Gallo-Romance language, less palatalization in comparison with Central, Eastern and Western Oïl languages) (north of Joret line)
Amiénois
Vimeu-Ponthieu
Vermandois
Thiérache
Beauvaisis
"Chtimi" (Bassin Minier, Lille)
Lille (Lille, Roubaix, Tourcoing, Mouscron, Comines) (Roubaignot)
"Rouchi" – Tournaisis (Valenciennois)
Borain
Artésien Rural
Boulonnais
Walloon (Walon) (although it is closely related to Picard and a North Oïl language, it is south of Joret line)
Western Waloon / Wallo-Picard (Walo-Picård) – the dialect closest to French proper and with a strong Picard influence, spoken in Charleroi (Tchårlerwè), Nivelles (Nivele), and Philippeville (Flipvile)
Central Waloon / Namurois (Walon do Mitan) – spoken in Namur (Nameur), the Wallon capital, and the cities of Wavre (Åve) and Dinant
Eastern Waloon / Liégeois (Walon do Levant) – in many respects the most conservative and idiosyncratic of the dialects, spoken in Liège (Lidje), Verviers (Vervî), Malmedy (Måmdi), Huy (Hu), and Waremme (Wareme)
Southern Waloon / Wallo-Lorrain (Walon Nonnrece) – close to the Lorrain and to a lesser extent Champenois languages, spoken in Bastogne, Marche-en-Famenne (Måtche-el-Fåmene), and Neufchâteau (Li Tchestea), all in the Ardennes region.
Southwest Oïl
Poitevin-Saintongeais (Poetevin-Séntunjhaes) (South Gallo-Romance Occitan substrate)
Poitevin (Poetevin)
Saintongeais (Saintonjhais)
Zarphatic (Judaeo-French) (צרפתית – Tzarfatit]]) (from Zarpha = Tzarfa, Jewish name for France) (extinct)
Moselle Romance (extinct)
British Romance (?) (language of the Romano-Britons or Romanised Britons) (extinct)
Occitan-Hispanic (Occitan-Ibero-Romance) (Southern Gallo-Romance – Hispano-Romance) (dialect continuum)
Occitan (Southern Gallo-Romance) (Langues d'Oc) (dialect continuum)
Old Occitan / Old Provençal (Proensals / Proençal / Romans / Lenga d'Òc / Lemosin) (extinct)
Occitan (Occitan / Lenga d'Òc / Lemosin / Provençal)
Arverno-Mediterranean
Eastern
Provençal (Provençau (classical norm) / Prouvençau (mistralian norm))
Niçard / Nissart (in the lower County of Nice) (sometimes considered as a Ligurian dialect, however most scholars consider it to be an Occitan dialect)
Maritime (Maritim / Centrau/Mediterranèu)
Rhodanien (Rodanenc)
Shuadit (Judaeo-Provençal / Judaeo-Occitan) (Chouadit) (שואדית – Shuadit) (in Comtat Venaissin) (extinct)
Vivaro-Alpine (Alpine Provençal, Gavòt) (Vivaroalpenc / Vivaroaupenc)
Eastern
Alpine
Cisalpine / Eastern Alpine (Cisalpenc / Alpenc Oriental) (in the Occitan Valleys, which are located in Italy – Piedmont and Liguria)
Mentonasc (in and around Menton) (sometimes considered as transitional between Ligurian and Occitan, however most scholars consider it to be an Occitan dialect)
Gavot (Gavòt) (in the western Occitan Alps, which are located in southeast France)
Guardiol (Calabria Provençal) (Gardiòl)
Western
 Vivaro-Dauphinois (Vivarodaufinenc)
Western
Auvergnat (Auvernhat)
Southern Auvergnat
Northern Auvergnat
Croissant Auvergnat (Bourbonnais d'Oc) (some features are transitional between Oc and Oïl languages)
Limousin (Lemosin)
Croissant Limousin (some features are transitional between Oc and Oïl languages)
Central Occitan
Lengadocian (Northern-Central) (Lengadocian / Lenga d'Oc)
Aquitano-Pyrenean (Transitional Southern Gallo Romance – Hispano-Romance) (dialect continuum)
Gascon (Romance Gascon) (Gasco) (Aquitanian / Proto-Basque substrate that differentiate it from the other Occitan dialect continuum)
Lowland Gascon
East Gascon
West Gascon
Highland Gascon / Pyrenean Gascon
East Pyrenean Gascon
Aranese (Aranés)
Central Pyrenean Gascon
Western Pyrenean Gascon / Bearnese
Southern Lengadocian (Transitional Gascon-Lengadocian-Catalan)
Toulousien (Tolosenc)
East Iberian Romance (more related to the Occitan dialect continuum, has an Iberian substrate, that also contributes to differentiate it from the other Hispano-Romance languages that are called "Iberian Romance", although, except for, partially, Aragonese, they do not have an Iberian substrate but rather a Hispano-Celtic, Lusitanian or a Tartessian one) (it is a true Iberian Romance language by its Pre-Romance substrate language – Iberian, that in the Pre-Roman past was roughly spoken in the Catalan language area – the east coastal region of Iberian Peninsula)
Old Catalan (Catalanesch) (extinct)
Catalan (Modern Catalan) (Catalan–Valencian–Balearic) (Català / Llengua Catalana)
East Catalan
Northern Catalan / Rossellonese (mainly spoken in Roussillon, far southern Occitanie, far southern south France)
Central Catalan (basis of Modern Standard Catalan but not identical)
Balearic
Algherese Catalan (Alguerés) (in L'Alguer / Alghero, Sardinia, Italy)
West Catalan
Northwestern Catalan (including Lleida / Lerida)
Valencian
Catalanic (Judaeo-Catalan) (קטלאנית יהודית – Judeocatalà / קאטאלנית – Catalànic) (extinct)
Iberian Romance languages / Hispano-Romance (dialect continuum) (although they are called "Iberian Romance", because of originally being spoken in the Iberian Peninsula, except for, partially, Aragonese, they do not have an Iberian substrate but rather a Hispano-Celtic, Lusitanian or a Tartessian one) (Latin, in the Iberian Peninsula, did not become a First language and expanded at the same time in all the regions, first it became mother-tongue language in the Mediterranean coastal regions of the east, southeast and the south, then expanded towards the west and northwest and from the south towards north, and based on and from urban centers to the rural areas)
Southern Iberian Romance / Southern Hispano-Romance (dialect continuum) (dialects of early romanized regions, it was part of the Western Romance dialects, but also had some similarities with Italo-Dalmatian ones due to the influence of the aforementioned dialectal group)
Southern Iberian Late Latin / Southern Iberian Proto-Romance (it became more differentiated after the fall of the Western Roman Empire and the formation of the Suebian and Visigothic Kingdoms) (several dialects, Andalusi Romance descended from it)
Andalusi Romance (formed after the Arab and Moorish conquest and the formation of Al-Andalus under Arabic rule) (inaccurately called "Mozarabic") (لتن – לטן – Latino) (extinct) (a large dialect continuum) (uncertain classification within Hispano-Romance / Ibero-Romance or even Western Romance, it had isoglosses and other language features in common with both Eastern and Western Hispano-Romance languages and also with both Western Romance and Italo-Dalmatian, it had the characteristics of a conservative language but also had language innovations) (it had several similarities with Aragonese, however the classification of both languages under the name "Pyrenean" is inaccurate because both languages did not originate in the Pyreneans Mountains but in more southerner regions of the Iberian Peninsula, and also because, as a dialect continuum, some dialects were more akin to Navarro-Aragonese but others were not) (a Romance and not an Arabic language, not to be confused with Andalusi Arabic, although both languages were, more or less, spoken in the same territorial area and interacted) (it was the vernacular language of many Hispanic Christians, of Hispano-Roman origin, and Sephardic Jews that lived under Muslim rule as Dhimmis in Al-Andalus where people of Arabic origin or Arabized people were the ruling elite, and also was the vernacular language of many Muslim converts of Hispano-Roman origin; beside the dialectal variation between regions, there was also a sociological one – Christians used more Latin origin vocabulary, while Muslims used more Arabic origin vocabulary)
Eastern-Central Andalusi Romance (roughly matching the territory where the Hispanic Citerior Latin had been spoken, that is, part of the ancient Roman province of Hispania Citerior, later Hispania Tarraconensis, later Cartaginensis and Tarraconensis proper Provinces, East and Centre of the Iberian Peninsula) (it had several analogies and similarities with the languages or dialects of eastern part of the Northern Iberian Peninsula – Aragonese and Castilian)
Eastern Andalusi Romance
Zaragozan Andalusi Romance
Valencian Andalusi Romance
Central Andalusi Romcane
Tolledan Andalusi Romance
Southern-Western Andalusi Romance (roughly matching the territory where Hispanic Ulterior Latin had been spoken, that is, part of the ancient Roman province of Hispania Ulterior, later the ancient Roman provinces of Baetica and Lusitania, South and West of the Iberian Peninsula) (it had several analogies and similarities with the languages or dialects of the western part of the Northern Iberian Peninsula, mainly Galician-Portuguese and Asturian-Leonese)
Southern Andalusi Romance / Baetic Andalusi Romance
Sevillian Andalusi Romance
Cordoban Andalusi Romance
Western Andalusi Romance / Lusitanic Andalusi Romance
Badajoz Andalusi Romance
Lisbon Andalusi Romance
Northern Iberian Romance / Northern Hispano-Romance (dialect continuum) (dialects of later romanized regions, it was part of the Western Romance dialects in a higher degree than the southern ones)
Northern Iberian Late Latin / Northern Iberian Proto-Romance (it became more differentiated after the fall of the Western Roman Empire and the formation of the Suebian and Visigothic Kingdoms) (the northern varieties, already in the form of languages, expanded to the south with the Christian Reconquest)
Ebro Iberian Romance / Caesaraugustan Iberian Romance (early form of Aragonese that originated in the Ebro Basin) (dialect continuum)
Navarro-Aragonese / Middle Ebro Romance (early form of Aragonese that originated in the middle Ebro Basin, in the Ebro plain, mainly in La Rioja, and then expanded northeast, towards the Pyrenean Mountains, and southeast, towards Iberian Mountains) (although today it is only spoken in the central Pyrenean Mountains, in High Aragon/Upper Aragon, originally it was not spoken there and it was a later arrival in those mountains) (Celtiberian, Iberian and Basque substrates; influenced by Andalusi Romance and Basque) (extinct)
Old Riojan (roughly in the original area where the Romance language called "Navarro-Aragonese" originated) (extinct) (people shifted to a Riojan Castilian variety with a Navarro-Aragonese substrate)
Romance Navarrese (Basque substrate) (not to be confused with the Upper Navarrese and Low Navarrese / Navarro-Lapurdian dialects of Basque that is a language isolate and not an Indo-European language) (it was spoken in southern Navarre – in the south of the old Kingdom of Navarre) (extinct) (replaced by a form of Castilian Spanish with a Romance Navarrese substrate)
Aragonese (Aragonés / Luenga Aragonesa / Fabla Aragonesa) (at the present time it is only spoken in Upper Aragon / High Aragon or Northern Aragon, however, in the past, until late 17th and 18th centuries, Aragonese was spoken in a much wider land area including almost all of Aragon, except for La Franja, Southern Navarre, parts of Rioja and parts of inland Valencia Region)
Central Aragonese (roughly in the original area where the Romance language called "Navarro-Aragonese" originated) (extinct) (people shifted to an Aragonese Castilian variety with an Aragonese substrate)
Eastern Aragonese (extinct)
Western Aragonese (extinct)
Zaragozan Aragonese (extinct)
Northern Aragonese/Upper Aragonese (only surviving dialect group of Aragonese, today is synonymous with the whole language) (Aragonese Proper/Aragonese Middle Ebro Romance)
Eastern Northern Aragonese
Central Northern Aragonese
Western Northern Aragonese
Southern Northern Aragonese
Southern Aragonese (extinct) (people shifted to an Aragonese Castilian variety with an Aragonese substrate)
Inland Central Valencian
Judaeo-Aragonese (Chodigo-Aragonés) (extinct)
Western Iberian Romance / Western Hispano-Romance (dialect continuum) (although they are called "Iberian Romance", or more accurately West Iberian Romance, because of being in the Iberian Peninsula, they do not have an Iberian substrate but rather a Hispano-Celtic, Lusitanian or a Tartessian one)
Castilian (dialect continuum)
Old Castilian (Romance Castellano) (extinct)
Spanish (in the sense of a group of dialects forming a dialect continuum)
Peninsular Spanish / Spanish of Spain (European Spanish, Spanish of Europe)
Castilian Spanish (basis of Modern Standard Spanish but not identical)
Spanish / Castilian / Standard Spanish (Español / Castellano / Lengua Española / Lengua Castellana)                               
Northern Castilian
Castilian Proper (Castilian Core – regions of original Castilian language)
Old Castile Castilian (roughly in Old Castile)
Eastern Old Castilian (includes the dialects of Burgos and Soria provinces)
Burgalese (Burgalés) (in Burgos Province)
Sorian (Soriano) (in Soria Province)
Western Old Castilian (includes the dialects of Segovia and Ávila provinces and later expanded towards Valladolid and Palencia provinces)
Segovian (Segoviano) (in Segovia Province)
Avilese (Avilés) (in Ávila Province)
Northern New Castille Castillian (roughly in Northern New Castille) (includes the dialects of Guadalajara and Cuenca Province)
Guadalajaran (Guadalajareño) (in Western Guadalajara Province)
Alcarrian (Alcarreño) (in Southwestern Guadalajara Province)
Serrano Castilian (Castellano-Serrano) (in Eastern Guadalajara and Northern Cuenca Province)
Far-Northern Castilian 
Northwestern Castilian or Cantabrian Castilian (not to be confused with Romance Cantabrian, also called by its traditional name "Montañés", from La Montaña = Cantabria) (Romance Cantabrian substrate and influence) (roughly in Santander Province)
Transitional Northwest-Northeast Castillian (Miranda de Ebro is the main centre)
Northeastern Castilian (in old territory of the Autrigones, Caristii and Varduli tribes) (Basque adstrate influence) (mainly in Álava Province but also in western Bizkaia)
Far-Eastern Leonese Castilian
Palencian (Palenciano) (in Palencia Province)
Valliseletan (Valliseletano) (in most of Valladolid Province)
Southwestern Valliseletan (Valliseletano Suroccidental) (in Southwest Valladolid Province)
Salmantine (Salmantino) (in most of Salamanca Province but not in the Northwest)
Transitional Leonese Castilian
Leonese Castilian (not to be confused with Leonese dialects of Astur-Leonese) (Astur-Leonese substrate and influence)
León Leonese Castillian (in León city and territory)
Asturian Castilian (Castilian spoken by Asturians) (not to be confused with Astur-Leonese)
Galician Castilian (Castrapo) (Castilian spoken by Galicians) (not to be confused with Galician) (strong Galician substrate and influence)
Rioja Castilian (Riojano) (roughly in Rioja) (Navarro-Aragonese substrate)
Western Riojan
Central Riojan
Eastern Riojan
Navarre Castilian (South Navarre) (not to be confused with Navarro-Aragonese or with Upper Navarrese dialect of Basque) (Navarro-Aragonese and Basque substrate and influence)
Basque Castilian (Castilian spoken by Basques) (not to be confused with Basque)
Aragonese Castilian (not to be confused with Aragonese language) (Aragonese substrate and influence)
Southwestern Aragonese Castilian
Southern Aragonese Castilian (Churro)
Far-Southern Aragonese Castilian (Enguerino)
Central Aragonese Castilian
Zaragozano (in Zaragoza city and territory)
Northwestern-Northern Aragonese Castilian
Catalan Castilian (Castilian spoken by Catalans) (not to be confused with Catalan) (strong Catalan substrate and influence)
Catalan Castilian Proper
Balearic Castilian
Valencian Castilian
Central-Southern Castilian
Central Castilian (broad sense) (Southern Castilian in narrow sense) (Transitional Northern-Southern Castilian)
Castilian proper
Southern New Castile Castilian (roughly in Southern New Castille)
Madrid Castilian (Madrileño) (in Madrid city and region, present-day capital of Spain)
Transitional Madridian-Manchego
Manchego Castilian (Manchego) (La Mancha Castilian)
Western Manchego
Central Manchego
Toledan Castilian (Toledano) (in Toledo city and territory)
Eastern Manchego
Murcian
Central Murcian (Panocho)
Southern Murcian
Cartageno (in Cartagena city and territory)
Southeastern Murcian
Southwestern Murcian
Northwestern Murcian
Northern Murcian
Northeastern Murcian
Eastern Andalusian
Upper Eastern Andalusian
Low Eastern Andalusian
Transitional Granadine (Eastern and Western Andalusian transitional dialect) (in central and southern Granada Province)
Southern Castilian (broad sense) (Andalusian-Canarian) (strongly influenced Spanish American Spanish)
Andalusian (Western)
Seseo
Mainland Seseo
Sierra Morena Southern Slope Seseo (in the southern slopes of Sierra Morena, in parts of northwestern Jaen Province, Spain, and northern Córdoba, northern Seville and northern Huelva Provinces, Andalusia)
Cordobese (Cordobés) (in Córdoba city and most of Córdoba Province)
Sevillian (Sevillano) (in Seville city and outskirts but not in most of Seville Province where a Ceceo type dialect is spoken)
Canarian (in the Canary Islands)
Lanzarote Canarian Spanish (in Lanzarote)
Fuerteventura Canarian Spanish (in Fuerteventura)
Gran Canaria Canarian Spanish (in Gran Canaria)
Tenerife Canarian Spanish (in Tenerife)
Gomera Canarian Spanish (in La Gomera)
Palma Canarian Spanish (in La Palma)
Hierro Canarian Spanish (in El Hierro)
Isleño (North American Canarian Spanish) (Spanish dialect of the Canarian Americans) (in Louisiana and Texas)
Ceceo
Seville Province Ceceo (in Seville Province, but not in the capital Seville itself)
Onubese (Onubense) (in southern Huelva Province)
Gaditan (Gaditano) (in Cádiz Province)
Malagueño (in most of Málaga Province)
American Spanish / Hispanic American Spanish (Spanish of the Americas)
Caribbean Spanish
Islands / Insular (strong influence from Canarian Spanish)
Cuban Spanish 
Florida Spanish (influence from American English)
Dominican Spanish 
Puerto Rican Spanish
Mainland / Continental
Panamanian Spanish
Caribbean Coastal Colombian Spanish
Mainland (Continental) (includes Barranquilla and Cartagena de Las Indias)
Islands (Insular) (in the Archipelago of San Andrés, Providencia and Santa Catalina)
Coastal Venezuelan Spanish
Zulian Venezuelan Spanish / Maracucho/Marabino Spanish/Maracaibero
Central Coastal Venezuelan Spanish
Mexican Spanish
Coastal Mexican
Central and Southern Gulf of Mexico Mexican Coast
Southern Mexican Pacific Coast
Central Mexican
Southern Central
Core Central (Altiplano)
Lowlands Central (Bajío)
Western Central
Northern Mexican
Eastern Northern
Western Northern
Peninsular Californian Northern (in most of Baja California)
Yucateco (Eastern Mexican)
Southwestern United States Mexican
Sabine River Spanish
New Mexican Spanish (an old Latin American Spanish dialect with its own features, not to be confuse with the more recent Southwestern United States Mexican)
Central American Spanish
Chiapas Spanish (Chiapaneco)
Guatemalan Spanish
Belizean Spanish
Salvadoran Spanish
Honduran Spanish
Nicaraguan Spanish
Costa Rican Spanish
Andean Spanish / Andean-Pacific Spanish
Venezuelan Andean (Tachirense)
Colombian Andean (main basis of Colombian Spanish)
Northwestern Colombian Andean/Paisa (Antioqueño) (includes Medellin)
Eastern Colombian Andean
Cundiboyá (includes Bogotá)
Central Colombian Andean
Southwest Colombian Andean (includes Cali)
Ecuadorian Spanish
Chocoan (in the Pacific Coast of Colombia)
Tumaquian (in the Pacific Coast of Colombia)
Lowlands / Western Ecuadorian Spanish
Esmeraldan
Manabita
Guayaquilian/Guayacan
Highland Ecuadorian Spanish / Andean Ecuadorian Spanish
Central (Quitoan)
Southern (Riobambanian)
Cuencan
Lojan
Peruvian Spanish
Peruvian Ribereño Spanish / Peruvian Coastal Spanish / Peruvian Coast Spanish
Andean-Coastal Spanish / Neolimeño (mixed features of both Peruvian Coast Spanish and Andean Peruvian Spanish)
Andean Peruvian Spanish / Highland Peruvian
Bolivian Spanish
Andean Bolivian / Highland Bolivian / Western Bolivian
Valluno
Vallegrandino
Camba / Lowland Bolivian / Eastern Bolivian / Media Luna Bolivian
Chapaco
Amazonic Spanish / Jungle Spanish / Loreto-Ucayali Spanish (most divergent of the Spanish American Spanish groups of dialects, could be a separate but closely related language to Spanish / Castilian)
Peruvian Amazonic
Colombian Amazonic Spanish
Llanero Spanish
Llanero/Plateau Colombian Spanish
Llanero/Plateau Venezuelan Spanish
Venezuelan Amazonic Spanish/South-East Venezuelan Spanish
Southern Cone Spanish
Chilean Spanish
Araucanian Chilean Spanish (Chilote)
Patagonian Chilean Spanish
Argentinian Spanish-Uruguayan Spanish
Northwestern Argentinian Spanish/Andean Argentinian Spanish
Central-Western Argentinian Spanish
Central Argentinian Spanish / Cordovian Argentinian Spanish
Western Argentinian Spanish/Cuyano Argentinian Spanish
Rioplatense Spanish (strongly influenced by Italian and other Romance languages of Italy, especially Neapolitan and Genovese Ligurian)
Buenos Aires Argentinian Spanish
Platine Mesopotamian Argentinian Spanish (between Uruguay and Paraná Rivers in Argentinian Mesopotamia)
Patagonian Argentinian Spanish
Uruguayan Spanish (is part of Rioplatense) (strongly influenced by Italian and other Romance languages of Italy, especially Genovese Ligurian)
Transitional Argentinian-Paraguayan Spanish
Northeastern Argentinian Spanish/Guarani Argentinian Spanish (Paraguayan Spanish and Guarani influence)
Paraguayan Spanish (strong Guarani substrate and influence)
Philippine Spanish (has a greater affinity to American Spanish, especially Mexican Spanish, rather than to Peninsular Spanish / European Spanish)
Maghrebi Spanish / North Africa Spanish
Saharan Spanish
Sub-Saharan Africa Spanish
Equatoguinean Spanish / Equatorial Guinea Spanish
Castilian Extremaduran (Southern-Central Extremaduran)/Castúo (in the historical Leonese Extremadura) (Extremaduran substrate) (until late 17th century and middle 18th century, before heavy Castilianization, Central and Southern Extremaduran dialects were closer to Northern Extremaduran and were part of an old dialect continuum transitional between Castilian to the east and Astur-Leonese to the west)
Central Extremaduran
Southern Extremaduran
Ladino / Judaeo-Spanish (לאדינו – Ladino / גﬞודﬞיאו־איספאנייול – Djudeo-Espanyol / Judeoespañol) (not to be confused with Latino, the Andalusi Romance self name or autonym) (originally it was the vernacular language of many Sephardic Jews in the kingdoms of today's Northern Spain, later the language expanded towards south, along Christian Reconquista, where many Sephardic Jews spoke Andalusi Romance as vernacular language)
Spain dialects (before the expulsion of Jews from Spain)
Out of Spain dialects (after the expulsion of Jews from Spain)
Western Ladino / Western Judeo-Spanish
Western Judaeo-Spanish / Haketia (traditionally it was spoken in Tangier, Tétouan, northern Morocco)
Eastern Ladino/Eastern Judeo-Spanish
South-Eastern (traditionally it was spoken in Salonica, Macedonia, Greece) and in Istanbul, Turkey
North-Eastern
North-Western (traditionally it was spoken in Sarajevo, Bosnia and Hercegovina)
Transitional Castilian – Astur-Leonese (Romance Cantabrian–Estremaduran) (an old dialect continuum and isoglosses severed by the expansion of Castilian towards west)
Cantabrian (Romance Cantabrian) (Cántabru / Montañés) (not to be confused with Celtic Cantabrian, a Hispano-Celtic dialect)
Eastern Cantabrian
Central Cantabrian (Pasiego-Montañés)
Pasiego (Passiegu)
Montañés
Western Cantabrian
Far-Eastern Leonese (Leonese of Palencia-Valladolid-Salamanca) (extinct) (in the past it was spoken in most of Palencia, Valladolid and Salamanca provinces but there people shifted to a Leonese Castilian variety)
Old Extremaduran (extinct)
Old Northern Extremaduran (Artu Estremeñu) (extinct)
Extremaduran (Northern Extremaduran) (Leonese Extremaduran) (Estremeñu) (in the historical Leonese Extremadura) (surviving language land of the Extremaduran language) (Northern Extremaduran and Extremaduran are now identical because it is the only surviving dialect of the language)
Old Central Extremaduran (Meyu Estremeñu) (extinct) (replaced by a Castilian based variety)
Old Southern Extremaduran (Bahu Estremeñu) (extinct) (replaced by a Castilian based variety)
Astur-Leonese (Asturian-Leonese dialect continuum) (transitional features between Cantabrian and Castilian to the east and Galician and Portuguese to the west)
Old Astur-Leonese (extinct)
Astur-Leonese (Asturllionés / Astur-Llionés / Llengua Astur-Llionesa) (at the present time it is spoken in Asturias and Northwestern León, however, in the past, until late 17th and 18th centuries, it was spoken in a wider area, including almost all of Leon region) (Astur-Leonese dialects have eastern, central and western dialect strips from north towards south with Asturian and Leonese subdialects or variants, although there is no clear linguistic division between both because the east, central and west dialect strips have more importance than an Asturian versus Leonese or vice versa distinction, that is, a North versus South dialectal distinction)
Eastern Astur-Leonese
Asturian dialects
Leonese dialects (Llionés)
Arribeiro (in La Ribera de Salamanca or Las Arribes, northwest Vitigudino Comarca, Northwest Salamanca Province), east of the border with northeast Portugal and the Douro river course) (severed from the Eastern Astur-Leonese dialects from the north by the Castilian expansion towards west)
Riba Côa Leonese (people in the lands east of the low and middle Côa river course although, by the political border, were in far northeastern Beira historic province of Portugal, they were Leonese and not Galaico-Portuguese speakers until the 13th and 14th centuries) (once spoken in Figueira de Castelo Rodrigo and Almeida and east of Vila Nova de Foz Côa municipalities)
Central Astur-Leonese
Asturian dialects
Northern Central (includes Oviedo – Uviéu and Gijón – Xixón)
Southern Central
Leonese dialects (in the past it included Llión / León, but people there shifted to a Leonese Castilian variety, Leonese substrate)
Leonese Proper (once spoken in León city and territory) (extinct)
Sayagüés (in Sayago Comarca, southwestern Zamora Province)
Western Astur-Leonese
Asturian dialects
A Zone
B Zone
C Zone
D Zone
Brañas Vaqueiras dialect
Leonese dialects
Central Western Leonese (includes Astorga)
Berzian-Cabreirese (in Eastern El Bierzo and Cabreira)
Sanabrian / Senabrian (Senabrés) (in Sanabria; Senabria in Astur-Leonese; Seabra in Galician)
Riudeonore-Guadramil-Deilon-Quintanilha Leonese – spoken in the four border villages of Riudeonore (Rio de Onor), Guadramil, Deilon (Deilão) and Quintanilha, in the Trás-os-Montes historic province, Bragança District (Portuguese District = County), far northeastern Portugal (although people from these villages were, by the political border, in Portugal, most were Leonese and not Portuguese speakers) (threatened dialect)
Riba Douro Leonese (people in the lands east of Sabor River and west of Douro River although, by the political border, were in far eastern Trás-os-Montes historic province of Portugal, they were Leonese and not Galaico-Portuguese speakers until the 13th and 14th centuries, after which they were bilingual until the 17th and 18th centuries, in the 18th century Portuguese replaced most of Leonese save for Mirandese, Mirandese is a surviving dialect of these Ribadouro Leonese dialects)
Mirandese (Mirandés / Lhengua Mirandesa) (close to Western Astur-Leonese or even a dialect of it – Southern Western Astur-Leonese, but with Portuguese influences as Adstrate and Superstrate) (recognized as a different native language in Portugal)
Raiano (Northern villages border dialect)
Central (Miranda do Douro town and most villages dialect, central area of Mirandese)
Sendinês (Sendim village dialect, far southern Mirandese)
Vimioso Leonese (extinct) (once spoken in Vimioso town and municipality)
Mogadouro Leonese (extinct) (once spoken in Mogadouro town and municipality)
Freixo de Espada à Cinta Leonese (extinct) (once spoken in Freixo de Espada à Cinta town and municipality)
Torre de Moncorvo Leonese (extinct) (once spoken in Torre de Moncorvo town and municipality)
Galician-Portuguese (dialect continuum)
Galician-Portuguese (Old Galician-Old Portuguese) (extinct)
Galician (Galego / Lingua Galega) (closely related to Portuguese)
Eastern Galician
Eonavian / Galician-Asturian) (Asturias Galician / Asturian Area of Galician) (Eonaviego / Galego-Asturiano) (some features are transitional to Astur-Leonese)
Ancares Eastern Galician
Central Western Eastern Galician
As Portelas Eastern Galician (in the west of Sanabria comarca – "A Seabra" in Galician, Northwest Zamora Province) ("As Portelas" means "The Small Ports", "The Small Land Ports"; Port = Passage)
Central Galician (Northern Coastal Galicia and inland central Galicia of the Miño and Sil valleys)
Mindoniensis Central Galician
Central Transitional Area
Lucu-Auriensis Central Galician
Eastern Transitional Area
Western Galician (Rias Galegas region – Rias Altas and Rias Baixas)
Bergantiños Western Galician
Finisterra Western Galician
Pontevedra Western Galician
Lower Limia Western Galician (Lobios municipality) (Lower Limia regarding Galicia, regarding Limia river total course, most it is in Portugal, it is Upper Limia)
Fala / Fala de Xálima / Xalimego ( Lagarteiru (in Eljas), Manhegu / Mañegu (in San Martín de Trevejo) and Valverdeiru (in Valverde del Fresno) (no common self name or autonym for the language) (closely related to Galician and to Portuguese but closer to Galician, although bordering Portuguese to the west, it is Galician-like, a related language enclave to Galician more than two hundred kilometers to the south) (in far northwestern Extremadura, southern slopes and valleys of Xálima / Jálama Mountain)
Portuguese (Português / Língua Portuguesa) (in the sense of a group of dialects forming a dialect continuum and including the main varieties European Portuguese and Brazilian Portuguese) (closely related to Galician)
European Portuguese (Portugal Portuguese / Portuguese of Portugal)
Northern (some features are transitional to Galician) (a typical feature of the Northern Portuguese dialects is that they have betacism, i.e. they don't distinguish between b [b or β] and v [v] phonemes, i.e v [v] phoneme is absent)
Alto Minhoto-Transmontano
Alto Minhoto (geographically in Minho Province but more closely related to the Transmontano dialect) (east Viana do Castelo District and far northeast Braga District)
Transmontano (in Trás-os-Montes Province, most of northern Vila Real District and most of Bragança District, save for Miranda do Douro Municipality)
Figueira de Castelo Rodrigo dialect (geographically in Beira Serra or Beira Transmontana Province, which was included in Beira Alta Province, but closely related to the Transmontano dialect)
Baixo Minhoto-Duriense – Alto Beirão-Beira Serrano
Baixo Minhoto-Duriense
Baixo Minhoto (in most of Minho Province) (matches most of Braga and west Viana do Castelo Districts)
Duriense (includes Douro Litoral Province and matches most of Porto District and the southwestern corner of Trás-os-Montes Province, which matches a large part of southern Vila Real District, located in Alto Douro Province, which was included in Trás-os-Montes e Alto Douro Province)
Oporto / Porto dialect
Alto Beirão-Beira Serrano (Inland Northern Central)
Alto-Beirão dialect (in western Beira Alta Province, matches Viseu District)
Beira Serra or Beira Transmontana dialect (in the Beira Serra or Beira Transmontana Province, which was included in the Beira Alta Province, roughly matches Guarda District) (more features in common with Northern dialects, but in the phonetics distinguishes between b [b] and v [v] phonemes, a typical feature of the Central and Southern dialects)
Central-Southern (a typical feature of the Central and Southern Portuguese dialects is that in the phonetics they don't have betacism, i.e. they distinguish between b [b] and v [v] phonemes, i.e. v [v] phoneme is clearly pronounced)
Coastal Central (Extremaduran Portuguese) (Português Estremenho) (Transitional Northern-Southern) (basis of Modern Standard European Portuguese but not identical) (although in the 20th century a province in the Central Coastal Lowlands region was called Beira Litoral, i.e. Litoral/Coastal Beira, older and traditional Beira Province was an inland province in the Highlands, while all Central Coastal Lowlands region of Mainland Portugal, from south of the Douro river, in the north, till the northern banks of the Tagus river, in the south, was the province of Estremadura until the middle of the 18th century) ("Beira" name means edge, slope, mountain slope, or border, with the specific meaning of "Mountainous Borderland" or "Edge Borderland") (until the 14th century the broad or collective name for all the portuguese territories south of Douro river was "Extremadura", i.e. "Far Border Land", the name derives from "Extrema", "Extremada" – extreme in the sense of extreme borderland, far borderland) (this name is cognate and has equivalents with the Leonese, Castilian and Aragonese Extremaduras, that were also old Borderlands at the beginning of the Christian Reconquista) (therefore "Estremadura" and "Beira" names had the meaning of "Borderland" in the context of the Christian Reconquista)
Northern Coastal Central (more features in common with Central and Southern dialects, but in the phonetics, some areas, mainly in Aveiro District, don't distinguish between b [b] and v [v] phonemes, i.e. they don't have v [v] phoneme, a typical feature of the Northern dialects)
Aveiro dialect (in most of the Aveiro District) (Portuguese District = County)
Coimbra dialect (in west Coimbra District) (Portuguese District = County)
Southern Coastal Central (Standard European Portuguese is mainly based on this dialect with also important contribution from Coimbra, i.e. the coastal central region, the ancient and traditional Portuguese Extremadura, from north till south – Aveiro, Coimbra, Leiria, Santarem and Lisbon, is the main basis of Modern Standard European Portuguese)
Leiria District dialect
Inland Lisbon District dialect
Lisbon dialect (early Lisbon dialect, Lisboeta, was only spoken in Lisbon itself and was an enclave, however today it is spoken in Lisbon metropolitan area, and is a very widespread dialect, many dialects are under pressure and being replaced by the standard language that closely resembles Lisbon dialect)
Standard European Portuguese (mainly based on the Coastal Central dialects - the dialect of the historical Estremadura)
Inland Southern Central (Beira-Baixa-Far Northern Alto-Alentejo) (a divergent group of Portuguese dialects in phonetics and some vocabulary, it forms its own dialectal group) (its more typical phonetic feature is the presence of the vowels ö [ø] and ü [y], phonemes that don't exist in the other Portuguese dialects or other Iberian Romance/Hispano Romance languages and dialects but are a typical common feature of the Gallo-Romance languages and dialects; several placenames/toponyms in Beira Baixa, roughly Castelo Branco County, and Far North Alto Alentejo, North Portalegre County, such as Proença, Old Occitan name of Provence, Ródão, from Rodano, a name for Rhodanus river, Tolosa, Occitan name of Toulouse, seem to testify an old Gallo-Romance presence of speakers in enclaves, they were assimilated to Galician-Portuguese but left a phonetic influence in the dialect of this region; in the 13th century, speakers of this dialect group also settled in Western Algarve, at the end of the Portuguese Reconquista; in the 15th and 16th centuries, speakers of this dialect group, mixed with speakers of other dialectal groups, settled in several islands of the Archipelagos of the Azores and Madeira) (declining and extinct in many municipalities where it was spoken)
Baixo-Beirão – Far Northern Alto-Alentejo
Baixo-Beirão (in Beira Baixa Province, which roughly matches Castelo Branco District)
Northern Baixo-Beirão (has some features of Northern Portuguese dialects in the consonants but not in the vowels)
Southern Baixo-Beirão (South Castelo Branco District)
Far Northern Alto-Alentejo (South of Tagus river, geographically in Alentejo but closely related to the Beira Baixa dialect and not to the Alentejo dialect)
Far Western Algarvian (geographically in the Algarve but is more related to the Beira Baixa dialect and not to the Algarvian dialect, it is an Inland Southern Central dialect enclave in Far Southwestern Mainland Portugal) (has the ü [y] phoneme but doesn't have the ö [ø] phoneme)
Southern
Southern Portuguese Extremaduran-Ribatejano
Southern Portuguese Extremaduran (traditionally in most of the Coastal Lisbon District, except for Lisbon itself, today is declining, being replaced by Lisbon Proper dialect in the Lisbon metropolitan area)
Ribatejano (along Tagus River banks) (in Ribatejo Province) ("Ribatejo – Riba Tejo" name means "Tagus Banks", from "Riba" – River Bank and "Tejo" – the Tagus river) (in large part of Santarém District)
Setubalense (in the Setubal Peninsula) (its more typical phonetic feature is that it doesn't distinguish between trilled r [r] and guttural r [ʁ] i.e. r is always pronounced as guttural r [ʁ]) (overlaps and under pressure of the modern Lisbon metropolitan area dialect)
Alentejano (its more typical phonetic feature is the pronunciation of more open vowels than in Standard European Portuguese, final vowel e [e] is generally pronounced as i [i] or the [i] vowel is added after a final consonant where Standard European Portuguese doesn't have a final vowel after a consonant, and has a distinct prosody) (in South Alto Alentejo and Baixo Alentejo Provinces) ("Alentejo – Além Tejo" name means "Beyond Tagus") (roughly matches south Portalegre District and Évora and Beja Districts)
Algarvian (closely related to Alentejano) (in most of the Algarve Province) (roughly matches central and eastern Faro District)
Islander (Geographical Grouping and not a Linguistic Genealogical one) (a divergent group of Portuguese dialects in phonetics and some vocabulary, several linguistic archaisms from Middle Portuguese when the islands were settled) (Azores and Madeira didn't have native Pre-European peoples)
Azorean (nine dialects in the nine islands of the Azores Archipelago, an areal grouping of dialects)
Mariense (Santa Maria Island dialect)
Micaelense (São Miguel Island dialect) (its more typical phonetic feature is the presence of the vowels ö [ø] and ü [y] in its phonemes, a common phonetic feature with Inland Southern Central dialects, mainly Baixo Beirão dialect, and with the more distant Gallo-Romance languages and dialects, it has more vowels than Standard European Portuguese and several long vowels, and it has a "French-like" prosody)
Terceirense (Terceira Island dialect) (its more typical phonetic feature is the presence of the semivowels [j] and [w] before a vowel in many words where Standard European Portuguese only has one vowel and a "singing-like" prosody)
Graciosense (Graciosa Island dialect)
Jorgense (São Jorge Island dialect)
Picoense (Pico Island dialect)
Faialense (Faial Island dialect) (Faial island dialect is closer to Standard European Portuguese than the dialects of other islands, initial Flemish settlers, that spoke the germanic Flemish dialect of Dutch, some years later were rapidly surpassed and assimilated by a big majority of Portuguese settlers that came from Coastal Central Portugal, whose dialect is the basis of European Standard Portuguese, and did not influenced Faial Island dialect)
Florentino (Flores Island dialect)
Corvino (Corvo Island dialect)
Madeiran (two dialects in the two islands of Madeira Archipelago, an areal grouping of dialect)
Portosantense (Porto Santo Island dialect)
Madeirense (Madeira Island dialect) (its more typical phonetic feature is the pronunciation of the vowels u [u] and i [i], in many cases, as a Schwa [ə] or as [ɐ], where Micaelense and Baixo-Beirão dialects have ü [y] and the palatalization of l [l] to [λ] before i [i])
American Portuguese / Portuguese of South America (not synonymous with Brazilian Portuguese, there is also a specific and native Uruguayan Portuguese that is not a simple dialect of Brazilian Portuguese)
Brazilian Portuguese (Portuguese of Brazil) / American Portuguese
Northern / Broad Northern (one of its earlier centers, in the 16th century, was Salvador da Bahia)
Bahian
Salvador da Bahia dialect (Soteropolitano)
Northeast
Eastern Northeast
Recifense (Recife and Olinda dialect)
Western Northeast
Cearense/Northern Coast
Amazonian/Northern Proper (sometimes also called Northern Brazilian)
Transitional Northern-Southern (Mixed Northern-Southern Portuguese Brazilian)
Amazonic Range (Serra Amazônica)/Deforestation Arc (Arco do Desflorestamento)
Southern / Broad Southern (one of its earlier centers, in the 16th century, was São Vicente, in the western half of the island with the same name, closely offshore of São Paulo State coast, in the eastern half of the island is Santos city)
Fluminense (Broad Rio de Janeiro, in the Rio de Janeiro State)
Rio de Janeiro dialect (Carioca)
Espiritosantense/Goitacá (in Espírito Santo State)
Mineiro (in central Minas Gerais State)
Belo Horizonte dialect
Brasiliense (in Brasilia, Brazil capital)
Sulista Lato Próprio (Broad Southern Proper)
São Paulo dialect (Paulistano) (São Paulo City Proper dialect)
Broad Paulista (Caipira)
Sertanejo/Southern Sertanejo (Sertanejo do Sul)
Southerner Proper (Sulista Próprio)/Gaúcho (sometimes Gaúcho is used as synonym of all Southern Proper Brazilian dialects)
Florianopolitano (Manezês) (in Santa Catarina State Coast) (stronger influences from European Portuguese, mainly from Azorean settlers and colonists of the 18th century)
Gaúcho / Narrow Gaúcho (Gaúcho Estrito) (in all the Rio Grande do Sul State or just the South of Rio Grande do Sul State along northern border of Uruguay)
Portoalegrense (in Porto Alegre)
Standard Brazilian Portuguese (mainly based on the dialects of the Southeast Brazilian States, São Paulo, Rio de Janeiro, Espírito Santo and Minas Gerais)
Uruguayan Portuguese/Fronteiriço (not a simple dialect of Brazilian Portuguese) (not confuse with Portunhol/Portuñol that is a mixed language)
African Portuguese
Cape Verdean Portuguese (not confuse with Cape Verdean Creole)
Guinean Portuguese / Guinea-Bissau Portuguese (not confuse with Guinea-Bissau Creole) (mainly in the capital Bissau)
Sao Tomean Portuguese / São Tomé and Principe Portuguese (not confuse with Forro/San Tomean and Principense Creoles)
Angolan Portuguese
Mozambican Portuguese
India Portuguese
Goan Portuguese
China Portuguese
Macanese Portuguese (not confuse with Macanese language or patuá, a distinct Portuguese creole)
East Timorese Portuguese
Minderico (Piação do Ninhou / Piação dos Charales do Ninhou) (originally it was a Portuguese-based Cant or Cryptolect) (not mutual intelligible with Portuguese because of divergent vocabulary) (spoken in Minde; Ninhou in Minderico)
Judaeo-Portuguese (udeu-Português) (it was the vernacular language of Sephardi Jews in Portugal before the 16th century) (extinct)
Eastern Romance languages
Pannonian Romance (extinct)
Daco-Roman (dialect continuum) (see also Eastern Romance substratum)
Proto-Romanian / Common Romanian
South-Danubian
Aromanian ( Rrãmãneshti / Armãneashti / Armãneshce / Limba Rrãmãniascã / Limba Armãneascã / Limba Armãneshce) (today most of the language is spoken in language enclaves or language islands scattered south of the Jireček Line, however there are also enclaves scattered along the Balkans south of the Danube and north of the Jireček Line)
North Aromanian
Farsherot (including Muzekean, in parts of Muzachia region, Myzeqe in Albanian) (spoken in language enclaves scattered along southern Albania and northwestern Greece)
Muscopolean (spoken in Muscopole, Voskopoje in Albanian, traditional Aromanian cultural centre and in other language enclaves scattered in mountainous areas of southern Albania, northern Greece and southwestern Northern Macedonia)
Gopish, Mulovishti, Beala de Sus, Beala de Jos dialect (4 scattered mountain villages – Gopish – Gopeš, Mulovishti – Malovište, Beala de Sus – Gorna Belica and Beala de Jos – Gorna Belica, which form language enclaves or language islands)
South Aromanian
Pindian (spoken mainly in language enclaves scattered in the Pindus Mountains but also in other mountainous areas of northern Greece)
Gramostian (originally from Gramos mountain range, Gramosta in Aromanian, later expanded northeastward and today spoken in language enclaves scattered in mountainous areas of northern Greece, eastern North Macedonia and southwestern Bulgaria)
Transitional South-North Danubian
Megleno-Romanian (Vlăhește) (spoken in the border area between northern Greek Macedonia and far south North Macedonia (Slavic Macedonia) to the west of the Axios or Vardar river, mainly west but also including a neighbourhood in Gevgelija town)
Northern
Central
Tsarnarekan (Karpian)
North-Danubian (dialect continuum)
Old Romanian (Daco-Romanian) (common ancestor of Romanian and Istro-Romanian)
Modern Romanian (Limba Română / Românește) (in the sense of a group of dialects forming a dialect continuum, not the Standard language, see below)
Northern Romanian (Graiuri Nordice)
Banatian (Bănățean) (in Banat region)
Crișanian (Western Transylvanian) (in Crișana historical region, divided between Romania and Hungary) (sometimes included in Transylvanian) (there are scattered Hungarian/Magyar speakers in northwestern Romania, mainly in Crișana, Tiszántúl for the Hungarians, by part of the Hungarians in Romania) (Hungarian and Romanian overlap several times in some regions)
Maramureșian (Northern Transylvanian) (Maramureșean) (in Maramureș) (sometimes included in Transylvanian)
Oașian (Northeastern Transylvanian) (in Oaș Country) (sometimes included in Transylvanian)
Bukovinian Romanian dialect (in Bucovina historical region, divided between Romania and Ukraine)
Transylvanian varieties of Romanian (Ardelenesc) (Ardelenesc varieties) (Transylvanian / Ardelean Proper) (Transitional Banatian-Moldavian) (Geographical Grouping) (in Transylvania, Ardeal in Romanian) (there is a large Hungarian/Magyar language majority enclave in Eastern Transylvania / Ardeal, in the geographical centre of Romania, spoken by the Hungarians in Romania, by the Székelys subgroup) (Hungarian and Romanian overlap several times in some regions) (Hungarian or Magyar is a non-Indo-European language belonging to another language family, the Uralic)
Southern-Central Transylvanian / Southern-Central Ardelean
Southern Transylvanian / Southern Ardelean
Central Transylvanian / Central Ardelean
North-Western Transylvanian / North-Westeren Ardelean
North-Eastern Transylvanian / North-Eastern Ardelean
Moldavian (Moldovenesc) (in Moldavia historical region, northeast Romania and the country of Moldova)
Low Danube-Danube Delta Moldovan (in the Low Danube and Danube Delta, far northern part of Dobruja historical region, Dobrogea in Romanian)
Southern Romanian (Graiuri Sudice)
Muntenian (Wallachian) (Muntenesc) (in Wallachia, Muntenia in Romanian) (basis of Modern Standard Romanian but not identical)
Romanian / Modern Standard Romanian (Daco-Romanian) (Limba Română / Românește)
Oltenian (Oltenesc) (in Oltenia)
Northern Dobrujan (in the northern part of Dobruja historical region, Dobrogea in Romanian, divided between Romania and Bulgaria)
Istro-Romanian ( Rumârește / Vlășește) (closer to Romanian, not to be confused with Istriot which is closer to the Dalmatian Romance language)
Cici (in Ciceria mountain range, Istria, Croatia)
Vlahi
Southern Romance (Insular Romance + African Romance – several archaic features in vocabulary and phonetics) (another alternative classification of the main Romance languages groups is the Western vs. Eastern Romance languages split by the La Spezia-Rimini Line)
Insular Romance (dialect continuum)
Old Corsican (speakers shifted to Italo-Romance varieties of Tuscan in the 13th and 14th centuries) (extinct)
Sardinian (Sardu or Lingua Sarda / Limba Sarda) (Paleo-Sardinian substrate)
Logudorese-Nuorese
Logudurese
Central (Common) Logudorese
Northern Logudorese
Nuorese
Campidanese
Arborense (Arborensi)
Ogliastrino (Ollastrinu)
Guspinese (Guspinesu)
Villacidrese (Biddexidresu)
Cagliaritano (Casteddaiu)
Meridionale
African Romance (extinct)

Celtic languages

Proto-Celtic (extinct)
Continental Celtic (all extinct; a paraphyletic grouping) (had both P Celtic and Q Celtic languages)
Eastern Celtic (insufficient knowledge if it was a P Celtic or a Q Celtic group or if it had both types of Celtic languages)
Noric? (or unclassified within Celtic)
Galatian
Lepontic
Lepontic
Gaulish? (P Celtic)
Gaulish
Cisalpine Gaulish
Hispano-Celtic (Q Celtic)
Celtiberian (Eastern Hispano-Celtic)
Gallaecian? (Western Hispano-Celtic) (or unclassified within Celtic)
Insular Celtic (has both P Celtic and Q Celtic languages)
Brittonic / British (P Celtic) (once it formed a dialect continuum which was broken first by Roman conquest, the formation of a Britannia province and the formation of a Romano-Britain Culture with British Latin language, and later by the Anglo-Saxon migration and settlement and spreading of their language in most of old Britannia, Great Britain)
Common Brittonic / Old Brittonic (extinct)
Eastern Brittonic (extinct after Anglo-Saxonic conquest and settlement in Britannia, today's England)
Southwestern Brittonic
Dumnonian (extinct)
Old Cornish (extinct)
Middle Cornish (extinct)
Cornish (Modern Cornish) (Kernowek)
Old Breton (extinct)
Middle Breton (extinct)
Breton (Modern Breton) (Brezhoneg)
Léonard (Leoneg)
Trégorrois (Tregerieg)
Cornouaillais (Kerneveg)
Vannetais (Gwenedeg)
Guérandais (in Guérande and Batz-sur-Mer) (extinct)
Western Brittonic
Primitive / Archaic Welsh (extinct)
Old Welsh (extinct)
Middle Welsh (extinct)
Welsh (Modern Welsh) (Cymraeg / y Gymraeg) (Y Fro Gymraeg is the largest contiguous Celtic language area with a majority of speakers)
Gwent and Morgannwg
Dyfed
Gwynedd
Powys
Patagonian Welsh (in Y Wladfa - Chubut, Patagonia, Argentina)
Cumbric (extinct)
Ivernic? (hypothetical) (extinct)
Pictish
Pictish (may have been a Celtic language possibly related to Brittonic) (extinct)
Goidelic (Q Celtic) (dialect continuum)
Primitive Irish (extinct)
Old Irish (Goídelc) (extinct)
Middle Irish (Gaoidhealg) (extinct)
Modern Goidelic dialect continuum (teangacha Gaelacha / cànanan Goidhealach / çhengaghyn Gaelgagh)
Western Gaelic
Irish (Modern Irish) (Gaeilge) / Irish Gaelic (not to be confused with Irish English / Hiberno-English) (the districts part of regions were Irish is spoken as first language by a majority of people are known as Gaeltacht)
Standard Irish (An Caighdeán Oifigiúil) (pan-regional form)
Urban Irish (developing modern dialect in the urban areas, particularly in Dublin)
Leinster-Connacht Irish (in Central Ireland) (Lár – Middle, Central) (transitional characteristics between Ulster Irish, in the north, and Munster Irish, in the south)
Leinster Irish (in Leinster / Laighin) (extinct) (no longer part of the Gaeltacht) (the only Irish  is the Standard Irish)
East Leinster (Laighin Thoir)
The Pale Irish (in South The Pale / An Pháil) (extinct) (included Dublin) (originally was part of the Kingdom of Mide) (no longer part of the Gaeltacht) (the only Irish is the Standard Irish)
Midland Leinster-Connacht (Lár Tíre) (transitional between Leinster and Connaught dialects)
Connacht Irish (Gaeilge Chonnacht) (in Connacht)
Connemara Connacht Irish (in Connemara) (West Connemara is the largest contiguous Gaeltacht region)
West Aran Connacht Irish / Inishmore and Inishmaan Connacht Irish (in the Aran islands of Inishmore and Inishmaan but not in Inisheer where people speak a Munster Irish  dialect)
Mayo Connacht Irish (Erris / Iorras) (in Mayo)
Munster Irish (Gaelainn na Mumhan) (in Munster) (Deisceartach – Southern)
East Munster (Mumhain Thoir)
Ring and Old Parish Munster Irish (in Ring / Rinn Ua gCuanach and Old Parish / An Sean Phobal, Waterford County)
Inisheer (in Inisheer island, the easternmost of the Aran Islands)
West Munster (Mumhain Thiar)
Kerry Munster Irish
West Muskerry (in West Muskerry) 
Iverragh Peninsula (in the Iveragh Peninsula)
Dingle Peninsula (in the Dingle Peninsula)
Newfoundland Irish (in Newfoundland) (extinct)
Central-Eastern Gaelic (Ulster Irish, Scottish Gaelic and Manx descend from the Goidelic language that was spoken in the Ulster, north of Ireland, in the 6th to 8th centuries, and share a close common ancestor with Irish, they are not direct descendants from the Brittonic languages like Welsh)
Transitional Irish-Scottish Gaelic / Western-Eastern Gaelic
Ulster Irish (Canúint Uladh) (in Ulster) (Tuaisceartach – Northern)
West Ulster (Ulaidh Thiar)
Donegal Ulster Irish (second largest Gaeltacht region)
Bréifne (roughly matching west old Kingdom of Bréifne lands)
Acaill (an Ulster dialect exclave mainly in Achill Island and parts of the mainland, in Connaught – western Ireland)
East Ulster (Ulaidh Thoir)
Meadh Irish (in Meath) (extinct) (no longer part of the Gaeltacht) (the only Irish  is the Standard Irish) (most people from the two small enclaves of speakers in Meath part of the Gaeltacht – Baile Ghib (Gibstown) and Ráth Chairn (Rathcarran), are not speakers of the Meadh Gaelic Irish because they came from Western Ireland – Connemara, in Connaught, and County Kerry, in Munster, in the mid 20th century)
Straits of Moyle Gaelic / North Channel Gaelic (extinct)
Eastern Gaelic (Scottish Gaelic and Manx descend from the Goidelic language that was spoken in the Ulster, mainly in the Kingdom of Ulaid, north of Ireland, in the 6th to 8th centuries, and share a close common ancestor with Irish, they are not direct descendants from the Brittonic languages like Welsh) (Cumbric Common Brittonic and Pictish substrates)
Scottish Gaelic (Gàidhlig) (not to be confused with Scots or Scottish English) (the districts part of regions were Scottish Gaelic is spoken as first language by a majority of people are known as Gàidhealtachd)
Mid-Minch Gaelic (Gàidhlig Meadhan na Mara) (pan-regional form of Scottish Gaelic, developing standard Scottish Gaelic)
Highland Scottish Gaelic (also included Northern Lowland Scotland, north of the Firth of Clyde and Firth of Forth, this group of dialects has a Pictish substrate, from the Pre-Gaelic language once spoken in this area of Scotland)
Southern Highland
Argyllean Gaelic (in Argyll / Earra-Ghàidheal)
Tayside Gaelic (in Tayside / Taobh Tatha, including Perthshire / Siorrachd Pheairt and Angus / Aonghas, Kincardineshire / A' Mhaoirne (Mearns), Fife / Fìobha, Kinross-shire, Clackmannanshire / Siorrachd Chlach Mhannainn, and northern parts of Stirlingshire / Siorrachd Sruighlea, in Northern Lowland Scotland, where it was largely replaced by Scots language and Scottish English, however there are small enclaves of speakers)
Middle Highland (Meadhan)
West Middle Highland (Meadhan Siarach)
East Middle Highland / Grampian-Moravian Gaelic (in Grampian / Roinn a' Mhonaidh and Moray / Moireibh or Moireabh, hence the name "Moravian" for the dialect, in Northern Lowland Scotland, where it was largely replaced by Scots language and Scottish English, however there are small enclaves of speakers)
Hebridean / Hebridean Gaelic (in the Hebrides Islands / Innse Gall) (largest Gàidhealtachd region)
Lewis Gaelic (in the Isle of Lewis / Leòdhas)
North Highland
Sutherland Gaelic
East Sutherland Gaelic (Gàidhlig Chataibh) (extinct)
Caithness Gaelic (Northernmost Scottish Gaelic dialect, Utmost, Most Distant – Iomallach) (in Caithness / Gallaibh)
Canadian Gaelic / Cape Breton Gaelic (Gàidhlig Chanada / A' Ghàidhlig Chanadach / Gàidhlig Cheap Bhreatainn) (mainly Cape Breton Island in Nova Scotia) (part of the Gàidhealtachd)
Lowland Scottish Gaelic (extinct) (Southern Lowland Scotland, south of the Firth of Clyde and Firth of Forth, had a Cumbric substrate, from the Pre-Gaelic Celtic language once spoken in this area of Scotland) (no longer part of the Gàidhealtachd) (former speakers shifted to Scots and Scottish English)
Galwegian Gaelic (in Galloway / A' Ghalldachd) (extinct) (former speakers shifted to Scots and Scottish English) (Common Brittonic substrate)
Strathclyde Gaelic (extinct) (replaced by Scots and Scottish English) (in the east part of Strathclyde / Srath Chluaidh, roughly matching the old Kingdom of Strathclyde) (there is a community of Scottish Gaelic speakers in urban centers like Glasgow, Scotland's biggest city, however they are Mid-Minch Gaelic speakers, not of the old Strathclyde Gaelic dialect)
Lothian Gaelic (?) (this region in the southeastern corner of Scotland, Lothian, where Edinburgh, Scotland's capital is located, and including part of the east Borders, from an early time, 7th and 8th centuries, had Northumbrian Old English speakers and was the basis for the emergence, development and spreading of Germanic Scots, it is not sure if Scots Gaelic or Scottish Gaelic was spoken in this region alongside Cumbric and before the rooting of Northumbrian Old English, the ancestor of Scots language)
Manx Gaelic (Gaelg / Gailck) (not to be confused with Manx English) (Common Brittonic substrate)
Northern Manx (Gaelg y Twoaie)
Douglas Manx (?) (Gaelg y Doolish)
Southern Manx (Gaelg y Jiass)

Armenian language

Proto-Armenian (extinct)
Classical Armenian (Old Armenian) (գրաբար հայերէն – Krapar Hayeren / Grabar Hayeren գրաբար – Krapar / Grabar) (Classical language, High culture language, official language of the Armenian Kingdom, liturgical or sacred language of the Armenian Apostolic Church and the Armenian Catholic Church)
Liturgical Armenian
Middle Armenian
Judeo-Armenian
Armenian (Modern Armenian) (հայերէն]] or հայերեն – Hayeren) (dialect continuum)
Western Armenian (արեւմտահայերէն – Arevmdahayerēn) (dialect continuum)
-gë Dialects
Karin / Upper Armenia (Bardzr Hayk') (roughly in today's Erzurum city and Erzurum Province, Eastern Turkey)
Turuberan
Mush / Taron
Gavar subdialect
Van / Vaspurakan
Torfavan subdialect
Tigranakert Armenian / Aghdznik (Arzanene) (in Diyarbakır) (nearly extinct)
Kharpert-Yerznka / Sophene (Tsopk') (in Elazığ) (nearly extinct)
Nikopoli Armenian (in Nikopoli region, today's Şebinkarahisar / Shabin-Karahisar, Giresun Province, Black Sea Region, Turkey)
Trapizon Armenian (in Trabzon) (nearly extinct)
Homshetsi (Armenian spoken by the Hemshin Armenians)
Malatia Armenian (in Malatya) (nearly extinct)
Cilician Armenian (nearly extinct)
Sueidia / Syrian Armenian dialects (still spoken by Syrian Armenians)
Vakıflı Armenian (in Vakıflı, Turkey)
Kessab Armenian (in Kessab, Syria)
Latakia Armenian (in Latakia, Syria)
Jisr al-Shughur Armenian (in Jisr al-Shughur, Syria)
Anjar Armenian (in Anjar, Lebanon)
Arabkir Armenian (almost extinct)
Akn Armenian
Sebastia Armenian (in Sivas) (nearly extinct)
Tokat Armenian (almost extinct)
Western Armenian dialects in the diaspora
Smyrna Armenian (in today's Izmir, Izmir Province, Aegean Region, Western Turkey)
Nicomedia Armenian (in today's Izmit, Kocaeli Province, Northwestern Turkey)
Constantinople Armenian (in Istanbul, Northwestern Turkey) (nearly extinct)
Rodosto Armenian (in Rodosto, today's Tekirdağ, Turkey, close to Istanbul) (extinct)
Crimea Armenian (still spoken by Armenians in Crimea)
Nakhichevan-on-Don Armenian / New Nakhichevan / Nor Naxiĵevan Armenian (today included in the city of Rostov-on-Don, Russia)
Austria-Hungary Armenian (extinct) (an Armenian dialect of the European Armenian diaspora)
Eastern Armenian (արևելահայերեն – Arevelahayeren) (dialect continuum)
-owm Dialects
Araratian
Yerevan (basis of Modern Standard Eastern Armenian)
Jugha (originally in Julfa) (today in New Julfa) (still spoken by part of the Iranian Armenians)
Agulis (in Ordubad District, Azerbaijan)
Artsakh (Nagorno-Karabagh Armenian dialect / Karabakh)
Shamakha Armenian (in Shamakhi District, Azerbaijan) (nearly extinct)
Tiflis Armenian (in Tbilissi, Georgia)
Eastern Armenian dialects in the diaspora
Astrakhan Armenian (in Northern Caucasus and Astrakhan, Russia) (extinct)
-el Dialects (Tayk'-Nor Shirakan)
Ardvin / Tayk' (in Artvin)
Nor Shirakan / Parskahayk' (Persarmenia)
Khoy (in Khoy) (still spoken by part of the Iranian Armenians)
Maragha Armenian (in Maragheh) (still spoken by part of the Iranian Armenians)

Hellenic languages

Proto-Greek (extinct)
Mycenaean Greek (extinct)
Ancient Greek (Classical Greek) (Ἑλληνική – Hellēnikḗ / Ἑλληνική γλῶσσα – Hellēnikḗ glōssa) (includes Homeric Greek) (extinct) (Classical language, High culture language of Ancient Greece, Greek colonies and East Mediterranean)
Eastern
Central (Central Eastern)
Aeolic Greek (extinct)
Thessalian (in ancient Thessaly) (not the same as Modern Thessalian Greek that descends from Attic Koiné Greek) (extinct)
Boeotian (in ancient Boeotia) (extinct)
Asia Minor Aeolian (extinct)
Arcadocypriot (extinct)
Arcadian (in ancient Arcadia) (extinct)
Cyprian (extinct) (not the same as Modern Greek Cypriot that descends from Attic Koiné Greek)
Pamphylian Greek (in Pamphylia) (extinct)
Eastern (Southern Eastern)
Ionic (extinct)
West Ionic
Attic (extinct)
Koine Greek (ἡ κοινὴ διάλεκτος – hē koinḕ diálektos / Kοινὴ – Koinḕ) ("Koinḕ" means "Common" in the sense of "Supradialectal Greek") (extinct) (Classical language, High culture language of the Hellenistic time, Greek colonies, East Mediterranean, the east part of the Roman Empire and the East Roman Empire or Byzantine Empire, see Greek East and Latin West, original language of most of the Bible's New Testament, liturgical language / sacred language of the Greek Orthodox Church and Greek Catholic Church)
Biblical Greek (Biblical Forms of Koine Greek)
New Testament Greek (Greek of New Testament)
Septuagint Greek (Greek of Septuagint (Old Testament))
Jewish Koine Greek (Greek of Byzantine Jews)
Patristic Greek (Koine Greek of Orthodox Church fathers)
Medieval Greek (Byzantine Greek / Constantinopolitan Greek) (Colloquial or vernacular language of the East Roman or Byzantine Empire) (extinct)
Greek (Modern Greek) (ελληνικά – Elliniká)
Katharevousa (Καθαρεύουσα – Katharevousa) (Conservative variant of Greek)
Demotic (Δημοτική γλώσσα – Dimotikí glṓssa) (basis of Standard Modern Greek but not identical)
Modern Athenian / Metropolitan Athenian Greek (close to Standard Modern Greek) (not quite a Southern or Northern Greek dialect, although Standard Modern Greek is based predominantly on the southern dialects, especially those of the Peloponnese)
Southern dialects
Ionian-Peloponnesian
Archaic Demotic Southern Greek Dialects
Old Ionian Demotic Greek (all extinct)
Old Attican Demotic Greek
Old Athenian (archaic dialect) (traditional dialect of Athens)
Old Aeginian (in Aegina Island)
Old Euboean (in Kymi, Central Northern coast of Euboea Island)
Old Megaran Demotic Greek (extinct)
Old Demotic Peloponnese Greek (extinct)
Maniot (in Mani Peninsula) (archaic dialect)
Cargèse Greek (in western Corsica coast, to the north of Ajaccio) (extinct)
South Euboean
Peloponnese
Ionian Islands dialects
Cytherian
Zakynthian
Kefallonian / Cefallonian
Ithakan
Lefkadan
Paxian
Kerkyra / Corfu
North Epirote (in Thesprotia, North Epirus, Far-Southern Albania) (although geographically in the Northwest of Greece the dialect has more similarities with Southern Greek dialects)
Himariote
Cretan-Cycladian
Cycladian
Cretan
Southeastern dialects
Chiote-Ikarian
Chiote
Ikarian
Dodecanese
Cypriot
Southwestern-Southern Anatolian Greek (was more in contact with other Greek dialects than Pontic or Cappadocian Greek)
Dorian Anatolian Greek
Lycian Greek
Demotic Pamphylian Greek
Cilician Greek (extinct)
Central-Northern Greek
Central Greek ("Semi-Northern") (Transitional Southern-Northern Greek)
Boeotian
Phocian
Phthiotian
Evrytania
Aetolian
Acarnanian
Dhërmi and Palasë Greek (in Dhërmi and Palasë, Northern Epirus, Far-Southern Albania)
Desfinan
North Euboean-Sporadic
North Euboean
Sporadic
Skyriote
Mykonian
Lefkian
Northern dialects
Thessalian
Epirote (Southern Epirote but not the Northern)
Modern Greek Macedonian
Thracian Greek
Rumelian Greek
Constantinopolitan Greek (Greek of Constantinopolis / Byzantium, today's Istanbul)
Kastorian
Naoussan
Veurbinian
Sarakatsanika (Greek dialect of the Sarakatsani / Karakachani)
North Aegean
Lemniote
Samothracian
Imbriote
Thasian
Lesbiote
Samian
West-Northwest Anatolian Greek (was more in contact with other Greek dialects than Pontic or Cappadocian Greek)
Mysian Greek
Artakian
Bithynian Greek
Paphlagonian Greek (extinct)
Anatolian Ionian Greek
Smyrniote (Greek of Smyrna, today's Izmir)
Northern-Central Anatolian Greek/Northern-Central Asia Minor Greek (more divergent than Western and Southern Anatolian Greek, that were more in contact with other Greek dialects, divergent enough to be considered separate languages although closely related to Modern Greek, they descend from Medieval or Byzantine Greek)
Silliot (Greek of Sille, near Ikonion/Iconium, today's Konya) (was the most divergent of the varieties of Asia Minor/Anatolian Greek)
Pharasiot-Pontic-Cappadocian
Pharasiot (Greek of Pharasa, Faraşa, now Çamlıca village in Yahyalı, Kayseri, and other nearby villages, Afshar-Köy, Çukuri) (not particularly close to Cappadocian)
Pontic-Cappadocian
Pontic Greek (ποντιακά – Pontiaká) (spoken by the Pontic Greeks)
Western Pontic
Eastern Pontic
Trapezuntine (Greek dialect of Trebizond, today's Trabzon)
Chaldiote
Crimean Greek / Ukrainian Greek (Rumeíka)
Mariupolitan Greek (Rumeíka) (spoken in Mariupol, that was founded by Crimean Greeks, and about 17 villages around the northern coast of the Sea of Azov in southern Ukraine) (not confuse with Urum, which is Turkic, the language of the Urums, another Greek regional group that also belong to the wider Crimean Greeks)
Old Cappadocian Greek (former speakers shifted to a mixed Greek-Turkish language) (see Cappadocian Greek) (was spoken by the Cappadocian Greeks)
Italiot Greek dialects or languages (Magna Graecia Greek, Greek of Southern Italy) (Κατωιταλιώτικα – Katōitaliṓtika) (divergent enough to be considered separate from Modern Greek although closely related to it, they descend from Medieval or Byzantine Greek) (spoken by the Griko people)
Griko / Salentinian Greek (Γκρίκο – Gríko) (Doric-influenced)
Calabrian Greek (Γκραίκο – Graíko) (Northwestern Greek, Achaean and Ionic influenced)
Yevanic (Judæo-Greek / Romaniote) (probably extinct) (Hebrew substrate and influence)
Central Ionic (extinct)
East Ionic (Asia Minor Ionic)
Western
Doric (extinct)
Northwest Doric / Northwest Greek (extinct)
Epirote-Acarnanian-Aetolian (extinct)
Epirote (in Epirus) (extinct) (not the same as Modern Epirote Greek that descends from Attic Koiné Greek)
Acarnanian (in Acarnania) (extinct)
Aetolian (in Aetolia) (extinct)
Locrian-Phocian (extinct)
Locrian Greek (in Locris) (extinct)
Ozolian Locrian (extinct)
Epicnemidian Locrian (extinct)
Opuntian Locrian (extinct)
Phocian (in Phocis) (extinct)
Elean (in Elis) (Western Peloponnese Peninsula) (extinct)
Achaean Doric (in Achaea) (North Coast of Peloponnese) (extinct)
Doric proper (extinct)
Megarean (in Megaris) (extinct)
Corinthian (in Corinthia) (extinct)
Argive-Aeginetan (extinct)
Argive (in Argolis) (extinct)
Aeginetan (in Aegina Island) (extinct)
Laconian (in Laconia, including Sparta) (extinct)
Tsakonian (Tσακώνικα – Tsakṓnika / A Tσακώνικα γρούσσα – A Tsakṓnika gloússa) (Doric-influenced Koine, archaic and most divergent of Modern Greek varieties)
Messenian (in Messenia) (extinct)
Cretan (in Crete Island) (extinct)
Rhodian-Carpathian (extinct)
Rhoddian (in Rhodes Island) (extinct)
Carpathian (in Carpathos Island) (extinct)
Theran-Melian (extinct)
Theran (in Thera Island) (extinct)
Melian (in Melos Island) (extinct)
Asia Minor Doric (extinct)
Ancient Macedonian (not the same as Modern Macedonian Greek that descends from Attic Koiné Greek) (extinct)

Albanian language

Proto-Albanian (extinct)
Middle Albanian (extinct)
Albanian (Modern Albanian) (Shqip / Gjuha Shqipe) (dialect continuum)
Gheg Albanian (Gegnisht) (Northern Albanian dialect)
Northern Gheg
Northwestern Gheg
Arbanasi (Albanian of Zadar, Croatia)
Istrian Albanian (extinct)
Northeastern Gheg (Northeast Albania and most of Kosovo)
Southern Gheg (Central-Southern Gheg)
Central Gheg
Upper Reka
Southern Gheg (includes the capital Tiranë)
Transitional Gheg-Tosk Albanian
Southern Elbasan
Southern Peqin
Northwestern Gramsh
Tosk Albanian (Toskërisht) (Southern Albanian dialect, basis of Standard Modern Albanian but not identical)
Northern Tosk
Mandritsa Tosk (in far southeast Bulgaria)
Lab
Cham
Arbëresh (Arbërisht) (Tosk Albanian variety of Southern Italy)
Puglia Arbëresh/Apulio-Arbëresh
Molise Arbëresh/ Molisan-Arbëresh
Campania Arbëresh/Campano-Arbëresh
Basilicata Arbëresh/Basilicatan-Arbëresh
Calabria Arbëresh/Calabro-Arbëresh
Sicilia Arbëresh/Siculo-Arbëresh
Arvanitika (Arbërisht) (Tosk Albanian variety of Central Greece)

Germanic languages

Proto-Germanic (extinct)
East Germanic (most archaic and divergent Germanic group) (all extinct)
Gothic (𐌲𐌿𐍄𐌹𐍃𐌺𐌰 / 𐌲𐌿𐍄𐌹𐍃𐌺𐌰 𐍂𐌰𐌶𐌳𐌰 – Gutiska / Gutiska Razda) (mainly recorded in Ulfilas Bible)
Crimean Gothic (Crimean Gothic although descends from Gothic is not a direct descendant of Biblical Gothic, the Gothic language of Ulfilas Bible) (remnant of an Ostrogothic dialect east of Dnieper river?)
Biblical Gothic (Liturgical language of the Ulfilas Bible)
Vandalic
Burgundian
Northwest Germanic (dialect continuum)
West Germanic (dialect continuum)
Elbe Germanic (Herminionic / Irminonic / Suebic / Alamanic)
Langobardic / Lombardic (extinct)
Suebian / Allemanian (extinct) (Suebian languages are thought to be a main source of the later High German languages)
High German languages (characterized by the High German consonant shift) (dialect continuum)
Old High German
Middle High German
Early New High German
New High German (Modern High German Varieties)
Central German / Middle German (Mitteldeutsch) (transitional between High and Low German but closer to the first)
East Central German (Ostmitteldeutsch) (main basis of Modern Standard High German but also with East Franconian influences)
Central East Central German
Thuringian-Upper Saxon
Thuringian (Thüringisch)
Central Thuringian (spoken around the Thuringian capital Erfurt, Gotha, and Ilmenau)
Northern Thuringian (around Mühlhausen and Nordhausen)
Eichsfeld dialect
Northeastern Thuringian (spoken around Artern as well as in the adjacent areas of Querfurt, Halle, and Merseburg of Saxony-Anhalt)
Mansfeld dialect
Ilm Thuringian (around Rudolstadt, Jena, and Weimar)
Eastern Thuringian (spoken around Eisenberg and Altenburg as well as in the adjacent area of Naumburg, Weissenfels, and Zeitz in Saxony-Anhalt)
Southeastern Thuringian (around Schleiz, Greiz, Saalfeld, and Gera, as well as around Ludwigsstadt in neighboring Bavaria)
Western Thuringian
Upper Saxon (Obersächsisch) (in fact it is East Thuringian – Ostthüringisch, and not truly Saxon, a North Sea Germanic descendant, what is called Upper Saxon is an Elbe Germanic descendant, and close to Thuringian) (roughly spoken on the Middle Elbe river basin)
North Upper Saxon (includes Leipzig)
Meissen dialect
Erzgebirgisch
Northern Bohemian German (Nordböhmisch) (nearly extinct) (it was spoken by part of the German Bohemians – Deutschböhmen, part of the "Sudeten Germans", a catch-all word for Ethnic Germans that lived in Bohemia, Moravia and Czech Silesia, western Czechoslovakia)
Iglauisch (it was spoken in Iglau region, modern Jihlava, a former german language island in the border between Bohemia and Moravia)
Schönhengstler (it was spoken in a region of far northeast Bohemia and far northwest Moravia, a former german language island in the border between Bohemia and Moravia)
Lusatian German (Lausitzisch)
Low Lusatian German (spoken in Lower Lusatia and northern Upper Lusatia) (not to be confused with Lower Sorbian, which is a West Slavic language) (Lower Sorbian substrate)
Western Lusatian German (spoken in Western Upper Lusatia) (Sorbian languages substrate)
Eastern Lusatian German (spoken in Eastern Upper Lusatia) (Sorbian languages substrate)
Upper Lusatian German (spoken in southern Upper Lusatia; with an American r) (not to be confused with Upper Sorbian, which is a West Slavic language) (Upper Sorbian substrate)
New Lusatian German (spoken in the area of settlement of the Sorbs; influenced by the Sorbian languages)
South Marchian (Südmärkisch) / South Brandenburgish (East Low German substrate)
Berlinerisch / Berlin German (spoken in Berlin) (East Low German substrate)
Schlesisch–Wilmesau
Silesian German (Lower Silesian German) (Schläsche Sproache / Schläs'sche Sproche) (mainly in Silesia historical region, it was the majority language in Lower Silesia until 1945) (nearly extinct)
Lowland Silesian (Neiderländischschläsche)
West Silesian (Westschläsche)
Middle/Central Silesian (Mittelschläsche)
Krauter (Kräuter) (included Breslau, today's Wrocław and Liegnitz, today's Legnica)
Brieg-Grottkauer (included Brieg, today's Brzeg)
Mountain Silesian (Gebirgsschläsche / Oberländisch) (was also spoken in Czech Silesia) (not to be confused with Upper Silesian which is a West Slavic language related to Polish)
Oberländisch Proper / Southwest Silesian (Südostschläsche)
Riesengebirgisch (it was spoken by part of the German Bohemians – Deutschböhmen, part of the "Sudeten Germans", a catch-all word for ethnic Germans that lived in Bohemia, Moravia and Czech Silesia, western Czechoslovakia)
Glatzian (Glätzisch) (in Glatz (district))
Upper Elbe Silesian German (North Moravian German – Nordmährisch) (moribund, nearly extinct) (was spoken by part of the Sudeten Germans)
Upper Oder Silesian German (North German Moravian – Nordmährisch) (in modern Czech Silesia) (it was spoken by part of the German Moravians – Deutschmährer, part of the "Sudeten Germans", a catch-all word for ethnic Germans who lived in Bohemia, Moravia and Czech Silesia, western Czechoslovakia)
Upper Silesian German (it was formed by several Germanic language enclaves or language islands in the slavic majority region of Upper Silesia) (included Oppeln, today's Opole) (not to be confused with Upper Silesian which is a West Slavic language related to Polish)
Volhynian German (Wolinisch / Wolinisches Hochdeitsch) (spoken by the Volhynian Germans) (until 1945 in scattered communities in Volhynia, northwestern Ukraine) – the dialect was formed with a main Silesian German basis and lesser Alemannic and Swabian (part of High German) contributions but also with a lesser Pomerelian German (part of Low German) contribution.
Wilmeserisch-Alzenerisch (Wilmesau-Alzenau) / Wymysiöeryś-Altsnerisch (Vilamovian-Haltsnovian) (in Wymysoü in Wymysorys, Wilmesau in German, Wilamowice in Polish, and Altsnau in Wymysorys, Alzenau in German, and Hałcnów in Polish, two contiguous settlements) (a Germanic language enclave or language island) (nearly extinct)
Wymysorys (Wymysiöeryś) (Vilamovian) (spoken in Wymysoü or Wilmesau in German, Wilamowice in Polish, on the border between Silesia and Lesser Poland, near Bielsko-Biała) (nearly extinct)
Alzenau (Haltsnovian) (Altsnerisch / Päurisch) (spoken in the former city of Altsnau, Hałcnów in Polish, which is now a district of Bielsko-Biała, Bielitz in German, Poland) (nearly extinct)
High Prussian (Hochpreußisch) (closely related to Silesian German) (it was spoken in southwestern East Prussia, region of Warmia and adjacent East Prussian Oberland region beyond the Passarge River in the west) (not to be confused with Baltic Prussian or Old Prussian) (nearly extinct, moribund)
Breslauisch / Breslausch (name that came from Breslau, modern Wroclaw)
Oberländisch
German (Deutsch) / Standard German (Standarddeutsch / Hochdeutsch) (based on the East Central German varieties and East Franconian ones)
German Standard German (Bundesdeutsches Hochdeutsch)
Luxemburgian variety (not to be confused with Luxemburgian, a West Central German language related to but not the same as Standard German)
Belgian variety
Austrian Standard German (Austrian German) (Österreichisches Standarddeutsch / Österreichisches Hochdeutsch) (not to be confused with Austro-Bavarian, an Upper German language related to but not the same as Standard German)
South-Tyrolean variety
Swiss Standard German (not to be confused with Swiss German which is based on Alemannic, an Upper German language related to but not the same as Standard German) (Schweizer Standarddeutsch / Schweizer Hochdeutsch)
Liechtenstein variety
Brazilian German
Upper German (Oberdeutsch) (from north towards south)
East Franconian (Ostfränkisch) / Main Franconian (Mainfränkisch), transitional between Central German and Upper German (has several dialects and sub-dialects) – descends from Elbe Germanic (language of Cherusci, Semnones and Hermunduri, among others) and Weser-Rhine Germanic (mainly the language of the Franks) contact and mixing (contributed to the formation of Modern Standard High German along with East Central German)
Lower East Franconian (Unterostfränkisch)
Hennebergisch: around Meiningen – Suhl – Schmalkalden
Rhön-Mundart / Rhönisch: in the Rhön Mountains
Lower East Franconian (in a stricter sense) (Engeres Unterostfränkisch): Würzburger Raum, Hohenlohischer Raum
Würzburgisch: in the Würzburg area (Würzburger Raum)
Taubergründisch: around Tauberbischofsheim
Hohenlohisch: in Hohenlohe
Ochsenfurter Mundart: around Ochsenfurt (ox ford - the name of the town is cognate with Oxford and has the same meaning: a ford where oxen crossed the river)
Schweinfurtisch: around Schweinfurt (swine ford - the name of the city has the meaning of a ford where pigs crossed the river)
Transitional Lower East Franconian - Upper East Franconian - Area between Lower East Franconian (Unterostfränkisch) and Upper East Franconian (Oberostfränkisch): Ansbacher-, Neustädter- und Coburger Raum (in Ansbach, Neustdt am Main and Coburg)
Itzgründisch - Coburgisch: Itzgrund and around Coburg/Koburg
Bambergisch
Ansbachsich
Upper East Franconian (Oberostfränkisch): Regnitz-, Hof-Bayreuther-, Obermain-, Nailaer- und vogtländischer Raum (in Regnitz, Hof, Bayreuth, Obermain, Nailaer)
Erlangisch
Nuremberg dialect (Nermbercherisch / Nürnbergerisch) (in and around Nuremberg) (it has influences from the Northern Bavarian)
Upper Franconian (Oberfränkisch) [in a strict sense] (Upper Franconian Proper): around Hof and Bayreuth
Vogtländisch (= Ostfränkisch-Vogtländisch): Vogtländischer Raum (in Vogtland, around Plauen)
South Franconian (Südfränkisch, (transitional between Central German and Upper German) – descends from Elbe Germanic (language of Cherusci, Semnones and Hermunduri, among others) and Weser-Rhine Germanic - mainly the language of the Franks) contact and mixing) (in and around Karlsruhe, Mosbach and Heilbronn)
Swabian-Alemannic (Schwäbisch-Alemannisch) (sometimes Swabian and Alemannic are included under "Alemannic" as general word for both groups)
Swabian (Schwäbisch)
South-East Swabian
Central Swabian
West Swabian (Württemberg Swabian) (spoken in Württemberg, including Stuttgart)
Swabian eastern diaspora dialects
Danube Swabian (Donauschwäbisch) (spoken by the Danube Suabians)
West Hungarian German (Westungarndeutsch) (spoken by the West Hungary Germans)
Satu Mare Swabian (Satmarschwäbisch) (spoken by the Satu Mare Swabians)
Black Sea Swabian German
Bulgarian German (Bulgardeutsch) (spoken by the Bulgarian Germans)
Dobrujan German (Dobrudschadeutsch) (spoken by the Dobrujan Germans)
Bessarabian German (Bessarabiendeutsch) (spoken by the Bessarabian Germans)
Black Sea German (Schwarzmeerdeutsch) (spoken by the Black Sea Germans)
Crimea German (Krimdeutsch) (spoken by the Crimean Germans)
Caucasus German (Kaukasusdeutsch) (spoken by the Caucasus Germans)
Alemannic (Alemannisch)
Low Alemannic German
Upper-Rhine Alemannic (spoken in southwestern Baden, Germany, and in Alsace, France)
Alsatian (Elsässisch / Elsässerditsch)
Nordbreisgauisch (Black Forest Alsatian) (in the Black Forest, part of Baden)
South American Alemannic diaspora dialect
Colonia Tovar German (Alemán Coloniero in Spanish) (spoken in Colonia Tovar, capital of the Tovar municipality in Aragua state, 65 km to the west of Caracas, Northern Venezuela)
Basel German (Baseldütsch) (spoken in Basel, Basel canton, Northwestern Switzerland)
High Alemannic German (Hochalemannisch)
Lake Constance Alemannic (Bodenseealemannisch) (transitional between Low and High Alemannic, although closer to Alemannic)
Eastern High Alemannic (east of Brünig-Napf-Reuss line)
Vorarlbergisch
Liechtensteinisch
Zürich German (Züritüütsch)
Western High Alemannic (west of Brünig-Napf-Reuss line)
Bernese German (Bärndüütsch)
Highest Alemannic (Hegschtalemannisch)
Walliser German (Wallisertiitsch) (spoken in Upper Valais, the higher and eastern part of Vallais Canton, a canton in Switzerland, the name "Walser" is derived from this name) (in the Lower Vallais, a Romance language related to French is traditionally spoken – Arpitan or Franco-Provençal)
Walser (Walscher / Walschertiitsch) (dialects that originally came from the Upper Vallais, traditionally spoken in several Alpine valleys)
Bavarian / Austro-Bavarian (Boarisch)
Northern Bavarian / North Bavarian (also known as Upper Palatinian / Oberpfälzisch) (spoken in Northern Bavaria or Upper Palatinate)
West Northern Bavarian
North Northern Bavarian
North-West Northern Bavarian
North-East Northern Bavarian (it was also spoken by part of the German Bohemians – Deutschböhmen, part of the "Sudeten Germans", a catch-all word for Ethnic Germans that lived in Bohemia, Moravia and Czech Silesia, western Czechoslovakia)
South Northern Bavarian
Transitional Northern-Central Bavarian (Northern Central Bavarian)
South-Eastern Northern Bavarian / South-Eastern Upper Palatinate
Northernmost Lower Bavarian
Central Bavarian
West Central Bavarian
Lower Bavarian (spoken in Lower Bavaria) (it was also spoken by part of the German Bohemians – Deutschböhmen, part of the "Sudeten Germans", a catch-all word for Ethnic Germans that lived in Bohemia, Moravia and Czech Silesia, western Czechoslovakia)
Rengschburgisch Regensburg dialect (in Regensburg, "Rengschburg" in Bavarian)
Lower Inn
Upper Bavarian (spoken in Upper Bavaria)
Salzburg dialect (Salzburgisch) (spoken in Salzburg)
West Bavarian (spoken in West Bavaria)
Mingarisch (Munich dialect, spoken in Munich, "Minga" in Bavarian)
Austrian Proper (Österreichisch) (East Central Bavarian
Upper Austrian (spoken in Upper Austria)
Lower Austrian (spoken in Lower Austria) (it was also spoken by part of the German Bohemians – Deutschböhmen and German Moravians – Deutschmährer, part of the "Sudeten Germans", a catch-all word for Ethnic Germans that lived in Bohemia, Moravia and Czech Silesia, western Czechoslovakia)
Viennese German (Weanarisch, spoken in Vienna, "Wean" in Bavarian)
South Central Bavarian
Upper Isar-Loisach (includes Garmisch-Partenkirchen)
Northeastern Tirolese
South Salzburg State
Styrian (Steirisch) (includes Graz)
Heanzen / Burgenlandish (Burgenländisch) (spoken in Burgenland, formerly known as Heizenland, which was also the name of a short-lived republic – the Republic of Heizenland, the border region between Austria and Hungary was mostly ethnic Austrian German, part of the land of the West Hungary Germans – Westungarn Deutsche)
Southern Bavarian
Tirolean
Eastern Tirolese diaspora dialect
Old Hutterite German (extinct)
Carinthian
Balkanic Carinthian diaspora dialect
Gottscheerish (Granish / Granisch, from the German word Krainisch – Carniola) (Gottscheerisch) (originally spoken by the Gottscheers or Gottschee Germans in the Gottschee enclave, a former majority German-speaking enclave in South Central Slovenia, today's Kočevsko, Municipality of Kočevje)
North American Carinthian diaspora dialect/language
Hutterite German (Hutterisch) (New Hutterite German is Carinthian German based and not Tirolean based like Old Hutterite German) (language of the Hutterite diaspora in the United States and Canada, they have their origins in Tirol and Carinthia, west and southern Austria)
Mòcheno (Bersntolerisch / Bersntoler sproch) (spoken in an alpine valley of Trentino – Bersntol in Mocheno and Valle del Fersina in Italian)
Cimbrian (Zimbar)
Seven Communities (Siben Komoin) (currently only the village of Roana (Robàan))
Luserna (spoken in Luserna, Lusern, Trentino)
Thirteen Communities (Dreizehn Komoin) (spoken currently only in the village of Giazza (Ljetzan))
Dialects of the villages in the Carnic Alps (spoken in Sappada, Sauris and Timau)
Weser-Rhine Germanic (Istvaeonic) (mainly it was the language of the Franks)
West Central German (Central / Middle Franconian) (descends from Weser-Rhine Germanic and participate in the High German consonant shift) (dialect continuum)
Rhenish Franconian / Rhine Franconian
Hessian (Hessisch)
Northern Hessian (around the city of Kassel)
Central Hessian (including the Marburg and Gießen areas)
Eastern Hessian (around Fulda)
Southern Hessian (in Darmstadt (region), basis of Frankfurt dialect) (meaning of Frankfurt name = Frank ford)
Hessian-Palatinate diaspora Koiné (of German diaspora in the Low Volga region)
Volga German (Wolgadaitsch) (mainly originated from Hessian and Palatine – Rhine Franconian dialects of Germans who migrated to the Low Volga river basin) (spoken by the Volga Germans)
Palatinate German / Rhenish Palatinate (Pälzisch) (Pfaelzisch–Lothringisch)
East Palatinate
West Palatinate
Palatinate Hunsrückisch / Rhenish Franconian Hunsrückisch (Hunsrückisch has two varieties, a Rhenish Franconian or Palatinate and a Moselle Franconian one)
Lotharingian (Lothringisch) (traditionally spoken in far northern Lorraine, northern France) (here it has the narrow sense of a variant part of the West Palatinate)
Rhenish Palatinate / Rhenish Franconian diaspora dialects/languages
Galician German (Galiziendeutsch) (spoken by the Galician Germans)
Pennsylvania German (Pennsylvania "Dutch") (Deitsch / Pennsilfaanisch Deitsch) (Pennsilfaanisch Deitsch is the self name or autonym of the language, "Deitsch" and "Dutch" are cognates but now have different meanings: one for Germanic language in a broad sense, not only for German in a narrow sense, and the other for specifically the Dutch or Nederlandic language, leading to the name Pennsylvania Dutch for the language in English due to the similarity of names)
Central Franconian proper
Moselle Franconian
East Moselle Franconian
Moselle Hunsrückisch (Hunsrückisch has two varieties, a Moselle Franconian variety and a Rhenish Franconian or Palatinate one)
Moselle Hunsrückisch dialect diaspora
Hunsrik (Hunsrückisch / Riograndenser Hunsrückisch) (mainly spoken in some areas of Rio Grande do Sul, Santa Catarina and Paraná states, Southern Brazil, South America) (mainly descends from the Moselle Franconian Hunsrückisch)
Siegerländisch (spoken in far southern Westphalia, in modern North Rhine-Westphalia state)
Nassauisch (spoken in Nassau (region), east of the Moselle and of the Rhine, in modern northern area of Rhineland-Palatinate)
West-Westerwäldisch (Rhineland-Palatinate) (includes Koblenz)
Untermosellanisch (Rhineland-Palatinate)
West Moselle Franconian
Eifelisch (Southern Eifel) (in Southern Eifel region, Rhineland-Palatinate, East Belgium, Luxembourg, southern North Rhine-Westphalia) (different from the Northern Eifel dialect)
Trierisch (Rhineland-Palatinate, Luxembourg, northwestern Saarland) (includes Trier)
Luxembourgish (Lëtzebuergesch) (a Moselle Franconian dialect raised to a National language)
West Moselle Franconian eastern diaspora dialects/languages
Transylvanian Saxon (Siweberjesch Såksesch) (despite the name "Saxon", the dialect is actually Moselle Franconian in origin and close to Luxembourgish not Saxon)
Central Franconian eastern diaspora dialects/languages
Carpathian German (spoken by the Carpathian Germans)
Pressburgish (was spoken by Carpathian Germans in part of Bratislava, Pressburg in German, Slovakian Capital)
Hauerlandish (was spoken by Carpathian Germans in Hauerland)
Zipser-Gründlerisch
Zipser German (Germanic dialect which developed in the Upper Zips region of what is now Slovakia)
Gründlerisch
Walddeutsch (extinct) (German dialect of the Walddeutsche – "Forest Germans" before Polonization and assimilation into Poles in the 17th and 18th centuries)
Zipser Bukovina German (Zipser Buchenlanddeutsch) (spoken by part of the Bukovina Germans – Buchenlanddeutsche)
Ripuarian / Ripuarian Franconian (Ripoarisch Platt / Ripoarėsch Sprooche) (descends from the language spoken by the Ripuarian Franks) (part of the set of isoglosses called the "Rhenish fan" in linguistics because of its shape on language maps)
Bönnsch Platt (spoken in Bonn)
Colognian (Kölsch Platt) (spoken in Cologne)
South Bergish / East Ripuarian
Nördliche Eifel (Eifelplatt) (spoken in Northern Eifel) (different from the Southern Eifel dialect)
Mittleres Erft- und Rurgebiet
Eischwiele Platt (spoken in Eschweiler)
Öcher Platt (spoken in Aachen) (Aachener Land)
Kirchröadsj Platt (spoken in Kerkrade)
Bocheser Platt (spoken in Bocholtz)
Yiddish (Jewish German) (ייִדיש, יידיש or אידיש – Jidish / 'Idish) (Jidish is the short name for Jidish Taitsh – Jewish German) (according to Max Weinreich and Solomon Birnbaum model it originated in Lotharingia or Loter, especially in the Middle and Upper Rhine basin, Rhine Valley, Rheinland and Palatinate, extending over parts of modern Germany (West) and France (North), with also a contribution from Bavarian German, according to other authors, later it would expand over western regions of Eastern Europe forming Eastern Yiddish) (for several centuries it was the traditional daily or vernacular language of the Ashkenazi Jews and still is for many Hasidic Jews, a subgroup of the Haredi Jews, who follow a branch of Judaism)
Western Yiddish (in many of the regions were Yiddish originated)
South Western (Swiss–Alsatian–Southern German Yiddish)
Judeo-Alsatian
Swiss Yiddish
Central Western / Midwestern 
North Western (Netherlandic–Northern German)
Central (Pomeranian-Brandenburgish-Sorbian) (transitional West-East Yiddish)
South Central (Sorbian Yiddish)
North Central (Brandengurbish-Pomeranian Yiddish)
Eastern Yiddish (it was the Yiddish dialect or language of many Ashkenazi Jews that originally came to the Kingdom of Poland and Grand Duchy of Lithuania, later unified in the Polish-Lithuanian Commonwealth, due to their historically religious tolerant policies; after the Partitions of the Polish-Lithuanian Commonwealth in the late 18th century, many of these Ashkenazi Jews started to live in the Jewish Pale or Pale of Settlement, western region of the Russian Empire, where most of European Jews lived, roughly corresponds to today's eastern and central Poland or Congress Poland, most of modern-day Ukraine, Bessarabia, Belarus, Lithuania and part of Latvia, in the southeast, including Daugavpils) (although they were called "Russian Jews", the large majority did not lived in Russia proper, very few actually lived in Russia due to the restrictive Russian Empire policy of the Jewish Pale and most lived in separate communities in Jewish small towns called "Shtetlach", they were called "Russian Jews" because most were subjects of the Russian Empire)
Central Eastern/Mideastern (Polish–Galician–Eastern Hungarian Yiddish)
South Eastern (Ukrainian–Romanian Yiddish)
Standard Theater Yiddish (Standard form of Yiddish used in theatrics)
North Eastern / Litvish (Lithuanian–Belarusian) (centered in modern-day Lithuania, Belarus, and most of Latvia, it was also spoken in portions of northeastern Poland, northern and eastern Ukraine and along Dnieper river valley and western Russia; many of these regions belonged to the Grand Duchy of Lithuania, hence the name) (it was the biggest Eastern Yiddish dialect by number of speakers and the most prestigious)
Klezmer-loshn (קלעזמער-לשון) ("Musician's Tongue") (Yiddish argot created by traveling Jewish musicians in the Russian Empire)
Literary Yiddish (Standardized Yiddish used in certain institutes such as YiVo)
Udmurtish (Yiddish spoken by Jews of Udmurtia and Tatarstan)
Low Franconian languages (descends from Weser-Rhine Germanic but did not participate in the High German consonant shift) (dialect continuum) (it was mainly the language of the Franks)
Old Low Franconian (Old Dutch)
Limburgish (Lèmburgs) / East Low Franconian
Bergish dialects
Ripuarisch-niederfränkisches Übergangsgebiet ohne nordbergischen Raum
Middle Dutch / West Low Franconian (Nederlands Dietsch / Nederlands Duutsch – Lowland Dutch or Lowland German/Germanic in a broad sense)
Dutch / Nederlandic (Modern Dutch) (Nederlands – short name for Nederlands Duutsch – Lowland Dutch or Lowland German/Germanic in a broad sense, hence the name Dutch for the language in English)
Central Dutch
South Guelderish (Zuid Gelders) / Kleverlandish
Hollandic (Hollands)
Utrechts-Alblasserwaards (considered part of Hollandic)
South Hollandic (Zuid Hollands)
South Hollandic dialect diaspora 
Afrikaans (Cape Dutch) (Afrikaans-Nederlands / Afrikaans-Hollands / Afrikaans-Hollands Duutsch – African Dutch / African Nederlandic)
Standard Afrikaans
Cape Afrikaans (Kaapse Afrikaans) (Broad Sense)
Western Cape (spoken in Western Cape Province, Southwest South Africa)
Cape Peninsula Afrikaans (Narrow Sense) (spoken in Cape Peninsula – Cape Town and environs)
Eastern Cape (spoken in Eastern Cape Province, South South Africa)
Northern Cape (spoken in Northern Cape Province)
Orange River Afrikaans (Oranjerivierafrikaans) (spoken in Free State Province, old Orange Free State)
North Hollandic
East Flemish (Oost Vlaams)
West Flemish (West Vlaams) (according to Ethnologue is divergent enough from Central Dutch to be considered a distinct language)
Central West Flemish
Mainland West Flemish
Coastal West Flemish
Westlands West Flemish
Brabantian (Brabants)
Zeelandic (Zeêuws) (according to Ethnologue is divergent enough from Central Dutch to be considered a distinct language)
Goeree-Overflakkee dialect
Walcheren dialect
Zuid-Beveland dialect
North Sea Germanic (Ingvaeonic) (it was the language of the mainland Saxons, which stayed in what is today Northern Germany, and of the Angles, Jutes, Frisians, among others)
Old Low German (Old Saxon) (did not participate in the High German consonant shift)
Middle Low German (Middle Saxon)
Low German (Modern Low German) / Low Saxon) (dialect continuum)
West Low German (Westniederdeutsch)
Northern Low Saxon
Schleswigsch, including Anglisch (language of the Angles substrate)
Holsteinisch
Dithmarsch (in Dithmarschen)
Low Elbian dialects
Hamburg German (Hamborger Platt) (in Hamburg)
Elb-Weser-Ländisch
Oldenburgisch (in the Oldenburg Land)
Nordemsländisch
North Hanoveranian
East Frisian Low Saxon-Gronings (Frisian substrate)
East Frisian Low Saxon (in East Frisia) (Frisian substrate)
Gronings
Stellingwarfs
Southern Low Saxon / Southern Low German (it is divided into an eastern – Eastphalian, and a western – Westphalian, language area)
Eastphalian
Heide-Eastphalian
Central Eastphalian
Hannoverian (traditionally in Hannover)
Elbostfälisch
Bördeplatt (includes Magdeburg)
Bodeostfälisch
Göttingisch-Grubenhagenian
ostfälisch-nordniederdeutscher Interferenzraum
ostfälisch-westfälischer Interferenzraum
Westphalian
East Westphalian
Münsterländisch
Westmünsterländisch
South Westphalian
Südemsländisch
Tweants
Achterhooks
Gelderish-Overijssels / North Gelderish-Overijssels
Veluws
East Veluws
West Veluws
Sallaans
Urkers
Drèents
East Low German (East Low Saxon)
Brandenburgisch (Märkisch) (Northern-Central Brandenburgisch) (Margravian)
North Brandenburgisch (North Margravian)
Central Brandenburgisch / Middle Brandenburgisch (Central Margravian)
Old South Brandenburgisch / Old South Margravian (extinct) (in the 17th and 18th centuries people shifted to an East Central German dialect – South Markish)
Old Berlinerisch (extinct) (people of Berlin in the 18th and 19th centuries shifted from a Saxon East Low German into an East Central German High German dialect)
Nordostniederdeutsch
Mecklenburgisch-Vorpommersch
Middle Pommeranian Neo-Brandenburgisch / Neo-Margravian (Middle Pommeranian, Mittelpommersch) (dialect formed by the expansion of Brandenburgisch into an older Pomeranian land) (Pomeranian substrate) (included Stettin, today's Szczecin, in Poland)
East Pomeranian (East German Pomeranian) (Hinterpommersch) (not to be confused with Slavic Pommeranian, the Slavic Pomeranians language)
North East Pommeranian
Western East Pomeranian (Westhinterpommersch)
Eastern East Pomeranian (Osthinterpommersch)
Bublitzisch
South East Pommeranian (Südhinterpommersch)
Pomerellian (Pommerellisch) (it was spoken in the Low Vistula region, former Pomerelia, and part of West Prussia) 
Low Prussian
Weichselplatt / Dialekt des Weichselgebietes / Dialect of the Vistula Lands (Weichsel = Vistula) (West Prussian / West German Prussian)
Danzigisch (formerly spoken in Danzig and Danzig Free State, modern Gdansk, in northern Poland) (it was spoken in part of Pomerelia or Vistula Pomerania)
Werdersch (formerly spoken in the Vistula Delta)
Molotschna dialect (originally it was spoken in Molotschna Colony or New Colony, located in modern Molochansk, Molochna river banks, Zaporizhzhia Oblast). Most Plattdietsch or Pomerelian speakers were not Mennonites; although Mennonite Low German mainly descends from Pomerelian German dialect, also called West Prussian German dialect, it was an adopted language from the originally Dutch, Flemish and Frisian Mennonites that came to the Lower Weichsel or Vistula region, mainly the delta; however, today Mennonite Plautdietsch, a diaspora dialect or language, is practically the only surviving form of Pomerelian German or West Prussian German; because of that, in modern times "Plautdietsch" or "Pomerelian German" and "Mennonite Plautdietsch" are almost synonymal). It is a Pomerelian German diaspora dialect/language / West Prussian German diaspora dialect/language (in Germany, Kazakhstan and the Americas). It is one of the Mennonite Plautdietsch or Mennonite Low German dialects (Dutch and Frisian substrate) (originally it was spoken by the Vistula delta Mennonites who came from the Low Countries in the 16th century, in the 18th century many migrated to the Russian Empire, to Novorossiya, in modern south Ukraine, however, at the end of the 19th century and early 20th century, most of them migrated to the Americas, first to Northern America and later to Latin America, people that are called "Russian Mennonites" are their descendants, although they are not of Russian background)
Nehrungisch (formerly spoken in the Frischen Nehrung – the Vistula Spit)
Chortitza dialect (originally it was spoken in Chortitza Colony or Old Colony, located in modern Khortytsia, an island in the big bend of the Dnieper, Zaporizhzhia Oblast) Most Pomerelian speakers were not Mennonites; although Mennonite Low German mainly descends from Pomerelian German dialect, also called West Prussian German dialect, it was an adopted language from the originally Dutch, Flemish and Frisian Mennonites that came to the Lower Weichsel or Vistula region, mainly the delta; however, today Mennonite Plautdietsch, a diaspora dialect or language, is practically the only surviving form of Pomerelian German or West Prussian German, because of that, in modern times "Plautdietsch" or "Pomerelian German" and "Mennonite Plautdietsch" are almost synonymal). It is a Pomerelian German diaspora dialect/language / West Prussian German diaspora dialect/language (in Germany, Kazakhstan and the Americas). It is one of the Mennonite Plautdietsch or Mennonite Low German dialects (Dutch and Frisian substrate) (originally it was spoken by the Vistula delta Mennonites who came from the Low Countries in the 16th century, in the 18th century many migrated to the Russian Empire, to Novorossiya, in modern south Ukraine, however, at the end of the 19th century and early 20th century, most of them migrated to the Americas, first to Northern America and later to Latin America, people that are called "Russian Mennonites" are their descendants, although they are not of Russian background)
Mundart der Elbinger Höhe
Mundart des Kürzungsgebiet(e)s
Westkäslausch
Ostkäslausch
Natangisch-Bartisch
Samlandic (included Königsberg, modern Kaliningrad)
Memelisch (formerly spoken in the Memel region, modern Klaipėda, in Lithuania)
Mundart des Ostgebietes (Dialect of the Eastern Lands) (formerly spoken in the eastern, northern and part of southern regions of East Prussia) part of East Prussian (not to be confused with Baltic Prussian or Old Prussian that is the substrate of Low Prussian German) (it was spoken in East Prussia, the true historical Prussia or Baltic Prussia dwelt by the Baltic Prussians before their conquest by the Teutonic Order and later Germanisation) (it included Königsberg, today's Kaliningrad, as its main centre; in modern times the region is divided between Kaliningrad Oblast, a Russian enclave, in the north, and the Masuria region of northeastern Poland, in the south)
Niederungisch
Litauisch (Lithuanian German Prussian) (dialect spoken by assimilated Lithuanians, known as Prussian Lithuanians, German Prussian Lithuanians, or Small Lithuanians – Kleinlitauener, the Lietuvininkai in Lithuania Minor) (it had Lithuanian substrate)
Anglo-Frisian languages (did not participate in the High German consonant shift)
Anglic languages (dialect continuum)
Old English (Anglo-Saxon) (Anglo-Saxon-Jute) (Anglisc / Anglisc sprǣc / Ængliṡc / Ænglisc sprǣċ – Seaxisc / Seaxisc sprǣc – Ēotisc / Ēotisc sprǣc) (extinct)
Anglian (Anglisc / Anglisc sprǣc / Ængliṡc / Ængliṡc sprǣċ) (ṡc = sh [ʃ] ; ċ = ch [tʃ])
Southumbrian
East Anglian
Mercian
Northumbrian
Jute (Ēotisc / Ēotisc sprǣc)
Kentish
Saxon (Seaxisc / Seaxisc sprǣc)
West Saxon
Middle English (Englisch / English / Inglis) (extinct)
Early Modern English
English (Modern English)
Standard English
Euro English
English English / England English / Anglo-English
Received Pronunciation (based on the standard accent of English as spoken in the south of England)
Central and Northern English ("Anglian English")
Central English (Southumbrian)
East Anglian English
Norfolk dialect
Suffolk dialect
Cambridgeshire dialect
Essex dialect
*West Midlands English
East Midlands English
South-East Midlands dialect
West Midlands English
Coventry dialect
Birmingham dialect (Brummie)
Black Country English ("Country of the Coal Mines")
Potteries dialect
North English (Northumbrian)
Yorkshire dialect
Transitional Yorkshire-North-East English
Teesside dialect
North-East English (Geordie)
Sunderland dialect (Mackem)
Pitmatic/Pitmatical
Northumbrian Proper
Manchester dialect (Mancunian)
Liverpool dialect/Merseyside English (Scouse, older name Lobscouse)
Lancashire dialect
Cumbrian dialect
Barrovian dialect
Broad South English ("Saxon English")
South English (many times is used as synonymous with the dialects of Southeast England)
London dialect
Cockney (traditionally in the London East End)
Estuary English/London Regional General British
Sussex dialect
Surrey dialect
Southeast English Proper
Kentish dialect
Isle of Wight dialect
West Country English (Southwest English)
West Country Proper
Bristolian dialect
Somerset dialect
Devonshire dialect
Anglo-Cornish (Cornish substrate)
Welsh English/Wales English
Cardiff English
Scottish English/Scotland English (not confuse with Scots, a separate but closely related language to English, and with Scottish Gaelic, a Celtic language, a separate but closely related language to Irish)
Lowland Scottish
Highland Scottish
Glaswegian (dialect of Glasgow)
Early Scots (extinct)
Middle Scots (extinct)
Scots (Modern Scots) (Scots/Lallans – Lowlands) (not to be confused with Scottish English or Scottish Gaelic)
Southern Scots
Central Scots
Ulster Scots 
Northern Scots
Insular Scots (Orkney and Shetland)
Manx English (not to be confused with Manx, a Celtic language, closely related to Scottish and Irish)
Irish English / Ireland English / Hiberno-English
Dublin English (historical beginnings with the English Pale)
Local Dublin English
New Dublin English
Ulster English / Northern Hiberno-English (not confuse with Ulster Scots)
Mid-Ulster English
Belfast dialect
South-Ulster English
West and South-West Irish English
South-West Irish English
West Irish English
Supraregional Southern Irish English
Béarlachas
Channel Islands English
Alderney English
Guernsey English
Jersey English
Gibraltarian English
Malta English
Maltenglish
French English (Franglais)
Dutch English (Dunglish)
Portuguese English (Porglish/Portuglish)
Italian English (Itanglese)
Sicillian English (Siculish)
Greek English (Greeklish)
German English (Denglisch)
Yiddish English (Yinglish)
Yeshivish
Czech English (Czenglish)
Danish English (Danglish)
Swedish English (Swenglish)
Finnish English (Finglish)
Polish English (Poglish)
Russian English (Runglish)
North American English/Broad American English
Canadian English
Standard Canadian English
Ottawa Valley English
Pacific Northwest Canadian English
Atlantic Canadian English
Newfoundland English
Canadian Maritime English
Black Nova Scotia (African Nova Scotian English)
Lunenburg English
Inland Canadian English
Quebec Canadian English (not confuse with Quebec French)
Ontario Canadian English
West Canadian English
Prairies Canadian English
British Columbia English
First Nations English/Aboriginal English in Canada
American English (USA English)
General American English
North and West
Northern New England
Eastern New England English
Northeastern New England (includes Boston and Maine)
Southeastern New England (includes Rhode Island)
Western New England English
Northwestern New England (includes Vermont)
Northern American English (a specific dialect and not synonym of North American English)
Southwestern New England (Eastern Northern American English)
Inland Northern American English (Great Lakes)
Western Northern American English (not confuse with Western American English dialect)
North Central American English (Upper Midwest)
New York City English (Metropolitan New York English/Greater New York City English)
Midland American English (General American has many features of Midland American but is not identical)
East Midland
Mid-Atlantic American English (includes Philadelphia and Baltimore)
Western Pennsylvania English (includes Pittsburgh)
Central Midland (Lower Midwest)
West Midland
Central Nebraska, Kansas and Oklahoma
Galveston, Texas
Western American English
Pacific Northwest American English
Alaska North American English
Hawaiian English
Hawaiian Creole
Bonin English
Southern American English
Lowland South
Older Southern American English (Classical Southerner)
General Older South
Piedmont and Tidewater Virginia
Plantation Southern American English
African American English (several common features with Southern American English) (divergent dialect)
Florida Southerner (many former speakers shifted to a Midland dialect)
Southern Louisiana
Cajun English (Cajun French substrate and influence)
East and South Texas
General Texan English (features of both Lower South/Lowland South and Upland South/Inland South) (West Texan)
Upper South/Upland South (Inland Southern American English)
Appalachian English (in Southern Appalachia) (divergent dialect)
Ozark Mountains (North Arkansas and South Missouri)
Southeast and South Oklahoma, North and West Texas, Southeast New Mexico
Peripheral Southerner (Archaic Southerner dialects)
Chesapeake Islands
Down East and Outer Banks
Lowcountry (Charleston-Savannah)
Chicano English (English of many Mexican-Americans)
Bermudian English
Caribbean English
Gullah-English (Geechee/Sea Island Creole English)
Afro-Seminole Creole
Bahamian English
Turks and Caicos Creole
Belizean English
Belizean Creole (Kriol)
Cayman Islands English
Bay Islands English (Caracol)
Mískito Coast Creole (Nicaragua Creole English)
Rama Cay Creole
San Andrés-Providencia Creole
Bocas del Toro Creole (Panamanian Patois English)
Jamaican English
Jamaican Patois
Limónese Creole (Costa Rica)
Samaná English
Puerto Rican English
Virgin Islands Creole
Leeward Caribbean Creole English (Antiguan English Creole)
Saint Kitts Creole
Montserrat Creole
Anguillian Creole
Kokoy Creole
Vincentian Creole
Barbadian English (Bajan English)
Barbadian Creole (Bajan Creole)
Grenadian Creole English
Trinidadian and Tobagonian English
Trinidadian Creole
Tobagonian Creole
Guyanese English
Guyanese Creole
Sranan Tongo – (Suriname)
Saramaccan – (Suriname)
Ndyuka/Aukan (Eastern Maroon Creole) – (Suriname)
Kwinti – (Suriname)
South Atlantic English – (Tristan da Cunha, Ascension Island, and Saint Helena)
Falkland Islands English
Arabic English (Arablish)
Hebrew English (Heblish)
Turkish English (Turklish)
Gambian English
Krio (Sierra Leonean Creole)
Liberian English
Kru Pidgin English
Liberian Kreyol/Kolokwa (Vernacular Liberian English) from African American Vernacular English
Merico language (Americo-Liberian settlers from the United States of America)
Ghanaian English
Ghanaian Pidgin English (Kru English)
Nigerian English
Nigerian Pidgin/Creole
Cameroonian English
Cameroonian Pidgin English/Creole
Pichinglis (Equatorial Guinean Pidgin/Fernando Po Creole English)
Namlish (Namibian English)
South African English
 White South African English
 Cultivated South African English
 General South African English
 Broad South African English
 Cape Flats English
 Black South African English
 Indian South African English
Malawian English
Ugandan English (Uglish)
Kenyan English
Sheng slang
Pakistani English (Paklish/Pinglish)
Urdish/Urglish
Nepalese English
General Indian English
Babu English
Butler English
Hinglish
Assamese English
Bengali English
West Indian English
Cultivated Indian English
Southern Indian English
Malayali English
Tamilian English
Tanglish
Punjabi English
Rajasthani English
Telugu English
Tenglish
Kanglish
Sri Lankan English (Ceylonese English)
Bangladeshi English (Benglish/Banglish)
Burmese/Myanmar English
Thai English (Tinglish)
Vietnamese English (Vinish)
Hong Kong English
Chinglish
Chinese Pidgin English
Korean English (Konglish)
Japanese English (Engrish)
Wasei-eigo
Malaysian English
Manglish
Singapore English
Singlish
Brunei English
Philippine English
Taglish
Coño English
Swardspeak
Bislish
Palauan English
Micronesian Pidgin English
Ngatikese Creole
Nauruan Pidgin English
Australian-New Zealand English
Australian English
Broad Country Australian English (Strine)
Cultivated Australian English
General Australian English
NT Australian English
Southeast Coast Australian English
New South Wales Australian English
Victoria Australian English
Queensland Australian English
Queensland Kanaka English
Tasmanian Australian English
South Australian English
Western Australian English
Australian Aboriginal English
Torres Strait English
Torres Strait Creole
Australian Kriol
New Zealand English
Maori Pidgin English†
Southland Dialect
Tok Pisin (Papua New Guinea)
Solomon Islands English
Pijin (Solomons Pidgin or Neo-Solomonic)
Bislama (Vanuatu)
Fiji English
Fijian Creole
Loyalty Islands Pidgin English
New Caledonia Pidgin English†
Samoan Plantation Pidgin†
Tongan Creole
Pitcairnese/Pitkern
Norfuk/Norf'k
Frisian languages (dialect continuum)
Old Frisian
Middle Frisian
North Frisian (Frasch / Fresk / Freesk / Friisk)
Island North Frisian
Haligolandic Frisian
Föhr-Amrum Frisian
Sylt Frisian
Strand Frisian (extinct)
Mainland North Frisian
Wiedingharde Frisian
Bökingharde Frisian (Mooring)
Goesharde Frisian
Halligen Frisian
Eiderstedt Frisian (extinct)
East Frisian
Ems Frisian
Saterland Frisian (Seeltersk)
Weser Frisian
Wangerooge Frisian (extinct)
Wursten Frisian (extinct)
West Frisian (Frysk)
Mainland West Frisian
Hindeloopen Frisian
Clay Frisian
Wood Frisian
Northern West Frisian
Southwestern Western Frisian
Island West Frisian
Schiermonnikoog
Aastersk (in Terschelling / Skylge Island)
Westersk (in Terschelling / Skylge Island)
North Germanic (dialect continuum)
Proto Norse/Proto Scandinavian (extinct)
Old Norse (Dǫnsk tunga) (extinct)
Old Gutnish (extinct)
East Scandinavian (dialect continuum)
Old East Norse (extinct)
Old Swedish (extinct)
Modern Swedish
Early Modern Swedish
Late Modern Swedish
Swedish (Contemporary Swedish) (Svenska)
Standard Swedish (Rikssvenska / Högsvenska)
Svealandic
Mälaren dialect
Stockholm dialects (Stockholmska) (Stockholm-Uppsala dialect) (basis of Modern Standard Swedish but not identical)
Uppländska dialect
Gästrikland dialect
Gnällbältet dialects
Västmanland dialect
Närke dialect
Western Södermanland dialect
South Dalecarlian Swedish dialect (not confuse with Dalecarlian)
North Swedish (Norrlandic)
Hälsing dialects
Medelpad
Hogdal
Ångermanland dialects
Transitional dialects between Ångermanland and Västerbotten
South Westrobothnian
North Westrobothnian
Piteå dialects
Luleå dialects
Kalix
Settler dialects (a large land area, roughly in Lapland Province, where Saami languages were traditionally spoken but now mainly with Swedish speakers)
Kiruna dialect
East Swedish (Finland Swedish)
Southern
Åland Swedish (in Åland islands, Southwest Finland)
South Finland Coast Swedish
Estonian Swedish (in Aiboland, the Swedish-speaking areas and towns of northern and western Estonia) (nearly extinct)
Northern
Ostrobothnian (in Ostrobothnia, parts of Western Finland coast) (most divergent East Swedish dialect)
Götalandic
Northern Smålandic (in Northern Småland)
Ölandic (in Öland)
Östergötlandic (in Östergötland)
Västergötlandic (in Västergötland)
Dalslandic (in Dalsland)
Värmlandic (in Värmland)
Northern Hallandic (in Northern Halland)
Gutnish (New Gutnish/Gotlandic) (Gotland Island)
Mainland Gotlandic
Faroymal
Immigrant variants (more sociolects than dialects)
Rinkeby Swedish
Transitional Danish-Swedish (also called South Swedish) (under pressure from Swedification and Standard Swedish) (Danish substrate) (divergent enough to be considered a separate language from Swedish and Danish although closely related and sharing features with both languages) (in Scania, Blekinge, South Halland and South Småland)
South Småländska dialect (Småländska)
Scanian (New Scanian) (Skånska)
Old Danish (extinct)
Middle Danish (extinct)
Danish (Dansk)
Eastern Danish
Old Scanian (was part of Eastern Danish until Swedish conquest at the 17th century that was later followed by Swedification) (in Scania, Blekinge and South Halland)
Bornholmsk
Insular Danish (basis of Modern Standard Danish but not identical)
Zealand Island dialect
Eastern Zealand
Copenhagen dialect
Southern Islands dialect (Møn, and Lolland-Falster)
Funen Islands dialect
Jutlandic (language of the Jutes substrate, was a West Germanic language and not a North Germanic/Scandinavian one)
Northern Jutlandic
Eastern Jutlandic
Western Jutlandic
Southern Jutlandic (language of the Angles substrate, was a West Germanic language and not a North Germanic/Scandinavian one)
Dano-Norwegian (Dansk-Norsk)
Norwegian Riksmål (written)
Norwegian Bokmål (written) (Bokmål)
Urban East Norwegian
Transitional East-West Scandinavian
Dalecarlian / Dalarna dialect (Dalmål) (spoken in Central and Northern Dalecarlia / Dalarna)
Lower Siljan
Upper Siljan
Elfdalian (Älvdalsmål)
Western Dalarna
Lower Western Dalarna
Upper Western Dalarna
Jamtlandic (New Jamtlandic) (Jamska)
Eastern Jamtlandic
Western Jamtlandic
West Scandinavian (dialect continuum)
Old West Norse (extinct)
Old Norwegian (extinct)
Middle Norwegian (extinct)
Norwegian (Modern Norwegian) (Norsk)
Norwegian Høgnorsk (written)
Norwegian Nynorsk (written) (Nynorsk)
Østlandsk (Østlandsk) (Østlandsk-Midlandsk) (Eastern Norway)
Østlandsk Proper
Flatbygd dialects (Flatbygdmål) (Lowland districts)
Vikværsk dialects (Vikværsk dialects) (Viken district)
Bohuslän dialect (Bohuslänska) (Bohuslän province)
Oslo dialect (Oslo)
Andebu dialect (Andebumål) (Andebu)
Grenland dialect (Grenlandsmål) (Grenland district)
Midtøstland dialects (Midtøstlandsmål) (Mid-east districts)
Ringerike dialects (Ringeriksmål) (Ringerike district)
Hønefoss dialect (Hønefossdialekt) (Hønefoss)
Ådal dialect (Ådalsmål) (Ådal)
Oppland dialect (Opplandsmål) (Opplandene district)
Hedmark dialects (Hedmark)
Solung dialect (Solung) (Solør)
Hadeland dialect (Hadelandsdialekt) (Hadeland district)
Østerdal dialect (Østerdalsmål) (Viken district)
Särna-Idre dialect (Särna-Idremål) (Särna and Idre)
Midland dialects (Norway) (Midlandsmål) (Midland districts)
Gudbrandsdal dialect (Gudbrandsdalen, Oppland and Upper Folldal, Hedmark)
Hallingdal-Valdres dialects (Hallingdal, Valdres)
Hallingdal dialect (Hallingdialekt)
Valdris dialect (Valdres district)
Telemark-Numedal dialects (Telemark and Numedal)
Bø dialect (Bøhering (dialekt))
other dialects
Vestlandsk (Western and Southern Norway)
South (Sørlandet/Sørlandsk)
Arendal dialect (Arendal region)
Valle-Setesdalsk dialect (Setesdalsk) (Upper Setesdal, Valle)
West (Vestlandet)
Southwest (Sørvestlandsk)
Jærsk dialect (Jærsk) (Jæren district)
Sandnes dialect (Sandnes)
Stavanger dialect (Stavanger)
Karmøy dialect (Karmøydialekt) (Karmøy)
Haugesund dialect (Haugesund-dialekt) (Haugesund)
Bergen dialect (Bergensk) (Bergen)
Strilar dialect (Strilamål) (Midhordland district)
Sogn dialect (Sogn district)
Nortthwest (Nordvestlandsk)
Sunnmøre dialect (Sunnmørsdialekt) (Sunnmøre)
Romsdal dialect (Romsdalsdialekt) (Romsdal)
Nordmøre dialects (Nordmørsdialekt) (Nordmøre)
Sunndalsøra dialect (Sunndalsøramål) (Sunndalsøra)
other dialects
Trøndersk (Trøndelag)
Outer Trøndersk
Fosen dialect (Fosendialekt) (Fosen)
Inland Trøndersk
Meldal dialect (Meldal)
Tydal dialect (Tydalsdialekt) (Tydal)
Härjedal dialect (Härjedalska) (Härjedalen)
Old Jamtlandic (extinct) (Old dialect of Jämtland province before Swedish conquest at the 17th century, people shifted to a language with features with both Nynorsk Norwegian and Swedish)
Namdalen dialect (Namdalsmål) (Namdalen)
other dialects
Nordnorsk (Nordnorsk) (Northern Norway)
Helgeland dialect (Helgelandsk) (Helgeland)
Brønnøy dialect (Brønnøy)
Nordland dialect (Nordlandsmål) (Nordland)
Bodø dialect (Bodødialekt) (Bodø)
Northern Norwegian
other dialects
Insular
Early Faroese
Old Faroese
Faroese (New Faroese) (Føroyskt mál / Færøsk sprog)
North Faroese
South Faroese
Old Norn (extinct)
Norn (Shetland and Orkney) (extinct)
Shetland Norn (extinct)
Orkney Norn (extinct)
Caithness Norn (in some areas of coastal Caithness) (extinct)
Old Icelandic (was a dialect of Old Norse)
Icelandic (Íslenska)
Greenlandic Norse (in Norse Greenland, three main areas of settlement in southwestern coast of Greenland: Eastern Settlement, Middle Settlement and Western Settlement) (extinct)

Balto-Slavic languages

Proto-Balto-Slavic (extinct)
Baltic languages
Proto-Baltic (extinct)
Eastern Baltic (Dnieper Basin Baltic) (dialect continuum)
Dnieper Baltic (spoken by the Dnieper Balts)
East Galindian (extinct)
Old Latvian (extinct)
Latvian (Modern Latvian) (Latviešu)
Latgalian (Upper Latgalian) (Upper Latvian) (Latgalīšu) (Augšzemnieku dialekts) (divergent enough to be considered a separate language from Latvian but closely related to it) (initially Latvian developed from the language of the Latgalians)
Latgalian Proper / Upper Latgalian Latvian
Southern
Central
Northern
Selonian Latgalian (Sēliskās Izloksnes) (Selonian substrate) (not confuse with Selonian language)
Latvian (Low Latvian) (Latviešu / Latviešu Valoda)
Middle Latvian/Central-Southwestern Latvian (Vidus dialekts) (Midus > Vidus) (basis of Standard Latvian but not identical)
Vidzeme-Semigallian
Vidzeme Latvian (Low Latgalian) (Videzemes Izloksnes) (initially Latvian developed from the language of the Latgalians)
Semigallian Latvian (Zemgaliskās Izloksnes) (Semigallian substrate) (not to be confused with Semigallian language)
Curonian (Latvian Curonian) (Kursiskās Izloksnes) (Curonian substrate) (not to be confused with Curonian language)
Kursenieki (Curonian substrate) (not to be confused with Curonian language) (dialect or language spoken by the Kursenieki)
Livonian Latvian (Lībiskais dialekts) (Livonian substrate) (not to be confused with Livonian)
Vidzeme Livonian Latvian (Vidzemes Izloksnes) (not to be confused with Livonian)
Courland Livonian Latvian (Kurzemes Izloksnes) (not to be confused with Curonian)
Transitional Latvian-Lithuanian
Selonian (extinct)
Semigallian (extinct)
Old Lithuanian (extinct)
Lithuanian (Modern Lithuanian) (Lietuvių Kalba)
Highland Lithuanian / Aukštaitian (Aukštaičių) (basis of Standard Lithuanian but not identical)
Eastern Aukštaitian
Southern Aukštaitian (Dzūkian)
Western Aukštaitian
Lowland Lithuanian / Samogitian (Žemaičių / Žemaitiu) (Curonian substrate)
Southern Samogitian
Western Samogitian
Northern Samogitian
Transitional East-West Baltic
Curonian (disputed; see Origin of Curonian) (extinct)
Western Baltic (Baltic Sea Coast Baltic) (dialect continuum)
Old Prussian / Baltic Prussian (Prūsiskan / Prūsiska Billā) (extinct)
New Prussian / Neo-Prussian (Revived Prussian) (Prūsiskan / Prūsiska Billā) (revived language with 50 second language speakers, some children are natively bilingual) (not to be confused with Germanic Prussian – Low Prussian and High Prussian)
Skalvian (extinct)
West Galindian (extinct)
Sudovian (Yotvingian) (extinct)
Slavic languages
Proto-Slavic (extinct)
North Slavic (dialect continuum)
East Slavic languages/Northeast Slavic (dialect continuum)
Old Novgorodian-Pskovian (Archaic East Slavic/Northwest Old Slavic or a North Slavic proper group)? (extinct)
Old Novgorodian (extinct)
Innovative East Slavic
Old East Slavic (Old Russian, Old Rusyn, Old Ukrainian and Old Belarusian) (extinct)
Ruthenian (Old Rusyn, Old Ukrainian and Old Belarusian) (extinct)
Southwest Old East Slavic (Old Rusyn)
Rusyn / Carpathian Rusyn (also known as Ruthenian, Rusinian) (Pусиньскый язык / Pуски язи – Rusîn'skyj Jazyk / Ruski Jazik / Pуснацькый язык – Rusnac'kyj jazyk / Πо-Hашому – Po Nashomu) (spoken by the Rusyns mainly in Carpathian Ruthenia, most in Transcarpathia, far southeastern Poland and far northeastern Slovakia and also in enclaves in Bačka, Vojvodina, northern Serbia; Slavonia, eastern Croatia; the Banat, southwestern Romania; and northern Bosnia) (divergent enough to be considered its own language, not a simple Ukrainian dialect, although it has some mutual intelligibility with Ukrainian)
Hutsulian / Gutsulian (dialect spoken by the Hutsuls or Gutsuls)
Boykian (dialect spoken by the Boykos)
Dolinyan / Sub-Carpathian
Lemkian (dialect spoken by the Lemkos)
Rusyn diaspora dialects
Pannonian Rusyn / Bačka Rusyn (Ruski jazik)
Canadian Ukrainian (Kанадсько-українська мова – Kanadsko-Ukraїnska Mova) (more closely related to Rusyn)
Southern Old East Slavic (Old Ukrainian)
Ukrainian (Українська мова – Ukrayins'ka Mova) (an older name was Little Russian – Малоросійський - Malorosiys'kyy or Малорусский - Malorusskyy)
Southern
South-Western (Western South)
Volynian/Volhylian
Podilian/Podolian
Upper Dniestrian
Sjanian/Sanian/Upper Sanian
Pokuttyan-Bukovynian
South-Eastern (Eastern South)
Middle Dnieprian (includes Kyiv, Cherkasy, Poltava) (basis of Modern Standard Ukrainian but not identical)
Kyiv dialect (in Kyiv)
Slobozhan / Slodozian / Slododzian (in Slobozhan or Sloboda Ukraine region) (in most regions it overlapps with Orlovskiy Russian dialect in a complex language situation)
Steppe Ukrainian (in most regions it overlapps with Orlovskiy Russian, Surzhyk, Standard Ukrainian and Standard Russian in a complex language situation)
Don Cossack
Balachka 
Black Sea-Kuban Cossack (mixed and overlapped with Orlovskiy Russian) (roughly in Krasnodar Kray including the Kuban (river) valley)
Mountain Cossack (North Caucasus Cossack) (mixed and overlapped with Orlovskiy Russian) (roughly in Krasnodar Kray)
Transitional Ukrainian-Belarusian (Northern Ukrainian dialects)
Polesian / Polisian
Eastern Polesian
Central Polesian
West Polesian
Motolian
Central Old East Slavic (Old Belarusian)
Belarusian (Беларуская мова – Biełaruskaja Mova)
South-Western
Slutskian
Mazyrskian
Hrodzean-Baranavian (Hrodna-Baranavichy)
Middle (basis of Modern Standard Belarusian but not identical)
Minskian (Menskian) (in Mensk / Minsk)
North-Eastern
Polatskian
Vitsebskian
East-Mahilioŭian (East-Mogilevian)
Transitional Belarusian-Russian (also included in the western group of Southern Russian dialects)
Smolenskian (Smolenskiy) (includes Smolensk, Nevel, Klintsy)
Northeast Old East Slavic (Old Russian)
Russian (Pусский язык – Russkij / Russkiy Yazyk) (an older name was великорусский - Velikorusskiy - Great Russian or Great Russian language) (distinction between russian dialects of primary formation and russian dialects of second formation is mainly chronological and geographical not genealogical) (dialects of primary formation correspond to Old Russia, mainly settled before 16th century, the Russian Core dialects in the central area of European Russia) (dialects of secondary formation correspond to the new territories where Russians expanded, mainly and especially after the Russian expansion and conquests from the 16th century until 19th centuries and the formation of a Russian diaspora outside Russia proper)
Southern Russian
Western Southern Russian
Upper Dnieper (includes Vyaz'ma)
Upper Desna (includes Bryansk)
Transitional Group A (between Western Southern Russian and Central Southern Russian) (includes Mosal'sk, Zhizdra, Sevsk)
Central Southern Russian / Oryol-Don / Kursk-Oryol (Orlovskiy – Orelian; Broad Orlovskiy) (includes Oryol or Orel, Kursk, Belgorod, Kozel'sk)
Orlovskiy Proper (origin in Oryol region) (spoken in east central and southern European Russia, including Russians in North Caucasus, and by many Russians in Eastern Ukraine and Southern Ukraine)
Transitional Group B (Tul'skiy – Broad Tulian) (between Central Southern Russian or Orlovskiy, and Eastern Southern Russian or Ryazan'skiy)
Tul'skiy – Tulian / Tulian Proper (includes Kaluga, Tula, Serpukhov, Kolomna)
Yeletsian (includes Yelets)
Oskolian (includes Stary Oskol)
Eastern Southern Russian (Ryazan'skiy – Ryazanian; Broad Ryazanian) (origin in Ryazan region) (east of the Don (river) and south of the Oka (river) ) (includes Ryazan, Lipetsk, Voronezh, Tambov) (spoken in east central and southeast European Russia, in part of the Middle Volga and in the Lower Volga, Volga Delta and Orenburg region, and along the border with western Kazakhstan and the Ural river region) (in some regions it overlapps with Central Russian dialects)
Central-Northern Russian / Middle-Northern Russian
Central Russian / Middle Russian (Transitional Northern-Southern Russian, has characteristics with both southern and northern dialects) (this dialectal area forms a big arc strip or bow-shaped strip, from northwest towards southeast, between southern and northern dialects, including both dialects of primary and second formation, from Saint Petersburg, passing by Veliky Novgorod, Tver, Moscow, Penza, Saratov and Volgograd, to Astrakhan)
West Central Russian / West Middle Russian (Novgorodskiy – Novgorodian) (Old Novgorodian substrate)
Groups with okanye
Gdov dialectal group (in Gdov city and region)
Novgorod dialectaL Group (in Luga, Novgorod, Valday)
Saint Petersburg dialect (in Saint Petersburg city and region)
Mixed Pskov-Gdov dialect
Lake Peipus dialect (Prichudskiy Govor)
Groups with akanye 
Pskov dialectal group (Pskovskiy – Pskovian) (in Pskov, Velikiye Luki, Toropets) (some features, but less, are transitional to Smolensk dialect and Belarusian)    
Seligerian-Torzhokian dialectal group (includes Seliger Lake region in the Volga river high course) (in Ostashkov, Rzhev, Torzhok)
East Central Russian / East Middle Russian (Moskovskiy – Broad Moskovian, dialects closer to Moscovian)
Groups with okanye (Vladimirsko-Povolzhskaya – Vladimirian-Volgian) (some characteristics are transitional and common to Northern Russian dialects)
Tverian or Western (in Tver and Klin)
Central (mainly between Volga and Oka rivers) (in Vladimir, Suzdal, Rostov in the Volga, Ivanovo)
Nizhny Novgorodian or Eastern (in Murom and Nizhny Novgorod)
Groups with akanye (includes Moscow, Yegoryevsk, Kasimov, Temnikov and Nizhny Lomov)
Group A – Moscovian Proper / Moscow dialect (in Moscow city and region) (basis of Modern Standard Russian but not identical)
Group B – Yegoryevsk-Kasimovian (in Yegoryevsk)
Group V (C) – Temnikov-Nizhny Lomov (in Temnikov and Nizhny Lomov)
Chukhloma dialect (in Chukhloma region) (a central Russian dialectal island)
Samara dialect (in Samara city and region) (forms a dialectal island)
Astrakhan Russian (in Astrakhan city and region)
Northern Russian
Western 
Ladoga-Tikhvin (in Novaya Ladoga and Tikhvin)
Eastern
Vologda-Vyatka / Vologda-Kirov (Vologodsko-Vyatskiy – Vologdian-Vyatian) (in Vologda, Vyatka or Kirov and Perm city and region)
Kostroma-Yaroslavl (in Yaroslavl and Kostroma)
Transitional groups
Onegian / Olonetsian Russian (Olonetskiy) (in south Lake Onega region) (includes Vytegra) (not to be confused with Olonets or Livvi-Karelian, an Uralic language) (Olonets / Livvi Karelian substrate and influence)
Lachian (eastern region of Lake Lacha)
Belozersk-Bezhetsk (in Belozersk, Bezhetsk, Cherepovets)
Pomor dialects (traditionally they were spoken by the Pomors in the northern coastal regions of the White Sea and Barents Sea, and also more inland, in the arctic regions of European Russia) (includes Arkhangelsk and Murmansk)
Siberian Russian dialects (a group of dialects in a very big landmass language area, in Siberia, in the broadsense also including the Russian Far East) (the dialects of the Siberian Russians and other Starozhily Russians were formed mainly on the basis of Northern Russian dialects although there was also contribution from the dialects of Russian settlers speaking dialects of Middle and Southern groups)
Alaskan Russian (still spoken in some scattered villages in Alaska, in Kodiak island and Ninilchik, by the Alaskan Creoles, they are distinct from the Russian Americans)
Russian diaspora dialects (spoken by ethnic Russians outside Russia, they have several dialectal group afilliations, a geographical grouping of dialects)
Eastern Europe
Belarusian Russian (spoken by a significant number of Belarusians throughout Belarus) (Belarusian influence and substrate)
Ukrainian Russian (spoken by a significant number of Ukrainians, mainly in Eastern and Southern Ukraine) (Ukrainian influence and substrate)
Odesan Russian (in Odesa, southwestern Ukraine)
Transdnistrian Russian (spoken in Transdnistria, a self-proclaimed state, to the east of Dniester river, far eastern Moldova and between Ukraine and Moldova by Ethnic Russians and others)
East Baltic Region
Estonian Russian (spoken by Russians in Estonia)
Latvian Russian (spoken by Russians in Latvia)
Lithuanian Russian (spoken by Russians in Lithuania)
Central Asia
Kazakhstan Russian (spoken by ethnic Russians mainly in the northern regions of Kazakhstan by Russians in Kazakhstan)
Northern America
Doukhobor (Диалект духоборов Канады – Dialekt Duchoborov Kanady) (traditionally it was spoken by the Doukhobors, later, at the end of the 19th century, they migrated to the provinces of Saskatchewan, Alberta and British Columbia, western Canada) (heterogeneous dialectal origin, has features both with Southern Russian dialects as well as with Central or Middle Russian ones)
Russian spoken as first or second language by Non-Ethnic Russians (higher influence from native languages and substrates)
Caucasus
Abkhaz Russian (Russian spoken by the Abkhazians)
Chechen Russian (Russian spoken by the Chechens)
Dagestani Russian (Russian spoken by the many ethnic groups of Dagestan)
Armenian Russian (Russian spoken by Armenians)
Central Asia
Kazakhstani Russian (Russian spoken by the Kazakhs) (not the same as Russian of the Ethnic Russians in Kazakhstan)
Kyrgyzstani Russian (Russian spoken by the Kyrgyz)
Israel
Israeli Russian (Russian spoken by Russian Empire Jews and Ethnic Jews that came from former Soviet Union Republics to Israel before but mainly after the Dissolution of the Soviet Union)
Transitional Russian-Ukrainian
Goryun / Horyun
Mixed Russian-Ukrainian dialectal area
Mixed Orlovskiy Russian and Steppe Ukrainian dialectal area (roughly in Krasnodar Krai, including the Kuban river valley)
West Slavic languages / Northwest Slavic (dialect continuum)
Lechitic
Old Polish (extinct)
Middle Polish (extinct)
Polish (Polski / Język Polski / Polszczyzna)
Lesser Polish (Dialekt Małopolski) (derived from the language of the Vistulans)
Holy Cross Mountains dialects (gwary świętokrzyskie), often associated with the ancient tribe of the Lendians (Lędzianie)
Lasowian dialect (gwara Lasowska)
Łowicz dialect (gwara łowicka)
Southern Borderlands dialect (Southern Kresy) / Podolian-Volhynian Polish (has affinities with Lesser Polish) (spoken in isolated pockets or enclaves in Ukraine in the southern Kresy, the Borderland regions) (Eastern Polish dialect in the former East Poland territories lost to the Soviet Union in 1945)
Lwów dialect (gwara Lwowska) (in Lwów, Lviv, western Ukraine)
Goralian (Highlander Polish dialects) (has several affinities with Lesser Polish dialect but it's not a simple subdialect of it)
Podhale (gwara podhalańska)
Żywiec dialect (gwary żywieckie)
Transitional Lesser Polish-Greater Polish-Mazovian (also included as subdialects of Lesser Polish or of Greater Polish) (Central Polish)
Sieradz-Łęczyca dialect (gwara sieradzko-łęczycka)
Sieradzanian
Łęczytsanian (includes Łódź)
Greater Polish / Greater Poland (dialekt Wielkopolski) (derived from the Western Slavic language spoken by the Polans (western)) (in Greater Poland)
Srodkowa (includes Poznań and Gniezno)
Chojno (Southern Greater Poland) dialect (gwara Chazacka)
Kujawy / Cuyavian dialect (gwara kujawska) (in Kuyavia)
Krajna dialect (gwara krajniacka)
Tuchola / Bory dialect (gwara tucholska)
Kociewie dialect (gwara kociewska)
Chełmno-Dobrzyń (gwara chełmińsko-dobrzyńska)
Masovian / Mazovian (basis of Modern Standard Polish but not identical) (derived from the language of the Mazovians)
Near Mazovian dialect (gwara mazowsze bliższe)
Warsaw dialect (Old Warsaw dialect) (nearly extinct) (modern Warsaw dialect is close to standard Polish)
Far Mazovian dialect (gwara mazowsze dalsze)
Kurpie dialect (gwara kurpiowska)
Malbork-Lubawa dialect (gwara malborsko-lubawska)
Ostróda dialect (gwara ostródzka)
Warmia dialect (gwara warmińska)
Podlachia dialect (in Podlachia - Podlasie)
Białystok dialect (gwara białostocka)
Suwałki dialect (gwara suwalska) (Suwalszczyzna)
Northern Borderlands dialect (Northern Kresy) / Northern Borderlands dialect (Belarusian Polish) (has affinities with Mazovian) (spoken along the border between Lithuania and Belarus, in the Northern Kresy, the Borderland regions) (spoken mainly by the Polish minorities in Lithuania and in Belarus) (Eastern Polish dialect in the former East Poland territories lost to the Soviet Union in 1945)
Wilno dialect (gwara Wileńska) (in Vilnius city and region, Lithuania's capital, southeastern Lithuania, and overlapping with Lithuanian)
New Mixed Dialects (in what is called Recovered Territories of western and far northern Poland, former ethnic and linguistic German majority territories of Silesia, Pomerania, East Brandenburg and most of East Prussia annexed in 1945 to Poland; several speakers of eastern Polish dialects settled in these regions and mixed with other polish dialect speakers)
Northern New Mixed Dialects
Northwestern new Mixed Dialects
Southern New Mixed Dialects
Masurian / Mazurian (Mazurská gádkä) (divergent enough to be considered a separate language from Polish although closely related to it)
Pomeranian
Kashubian (Kaszëbsczi jãzëk / Kaszëbsczi)
Northern Kashubian
Middle Kashubian
Southern Kashubian
Slovincian (Słowińskô Mòwa) (extinct)
Polabian (extinct)
Sorbian (Lusatian) (in Lusatia)
Lower Sorbian (Dolnoserbšćina / Dolnoserbski)
Upper Sorbian (Hornjoserbšćina / Hornjoserbsce)
Transitional Polish-Czech
Upper Silesian (Slavic Silesian) (Ślōnskŏ gŏdka / Ślůnsko godka) (disputed as separate language from Polish)
Southern Silesian
Cieszyn Silesian (Teschin Silesian) (Po Naszymu)
Central Silesian
Sulkovian
Prudnik
Northern Silesian
Niemodlin
Lachian (in parts of Moravian Silesia)
Czech-Slovak
Czech (Slavic Bohemian-Moravian) (Czech-Moravian) (Čeština / Český jazyk)
Czech proper (Čeština / Český jazyk)
Standard Czech
Common Czech (spoken primarily in and around Prague)
Slavic Bohemian / Bohemian 
Northeastern Bohemian dialects (Severovýchodočeská nářeční oblast)
Krkonoše subgroup
Central Bohemian dialects (Středočeská nářeční oblast)
Bohemian Praguian (includes Prague)
Southwestern Bohemian dialects 
South Bohemian (Jihočeská nářeční oblast)
Doudleby subgroup
West Bohemian (Západočeská nářeční oblast)
Chod subgroup
Transitional Bohemian (Czech)-Moravian
Bohemian–Moravian dialects (Nářečí českomoravská)
Moravian (Moravská nářečí/Moravština)
Central Moravian dialects (Nářečí středomoravská)
Central Central Moravian (Centrální středomoravská (hanácká) podskupina)
South Central Moravian (Jižní středomoravská podskupina)
Tišnov subgroup (Podskupina tišnovská)
Western Central Moravian (Západní středomoravská okrajová podskupina)
Eastern Central Moravian (Východní středomoravská podskupina)
New Mixed dialects / Peripheral Czech dialects (in former ethnic and linguistic German majority territories of the Sudeten Germans, Sudetenland, that where annexed to Czechoslovakia in 1945, border region of what is today the Czech Republic with Germany, Austria and Poland)
Transitional Moravian-Slovak (Eastern Moravian dialects) (Nářečí východomoravská)
Moravian-Slovak (Podskupina slovácká)
Moravian Wallachian (Podskupina valašská) (dialect of the Moravian Vlachs – at first a Romance-speaking and Orthodox Christian transhumant pastoralist people, they were originally Vlachs, i.e. Romanians, originating in Transylvania, central Romania, and migrated along the Carpathian Mountains towards northwest, they were Slavicized over time) (Romanian substrate)
Slovak/Slovakian (Slovenčina / Slovenský jazyk)
Western Slovak (in Trenčín, Trnava, Nitra, Záhorie and Bratislava)
Southwest
Zahorie
Trnava
Bratislava
Southeast
Northern
Central Slovak (in Liptov, Orava, Turiec, Tekov, Hont, Novohrad, Gemer and around Zvolen)
Northern
Southern
Lowland Slovak (Dolnozemské) (outside Slovakia in the Pannonian Plain in Serbian Vojvodina, and in southeastern Hungary, western Romania, and the Croatian part of Syrmia)
Eastern Slovak (in Spiš, Šariš, Zemplín and Abov)
Southwest
Central
Eastern
Knaanic (Judaeo-Czech) (from Knaan – Canaan, "language of Canaan") (extinct)
South Slavic languages (dialect continuum)
Western South Slavic / Southwest South Slavic (dialect continuum)
Slovene (Slovenski jezik / Slovenščina)
Pannonian (Pannonian Slovene)
Prekmurje Slovene (Wendisch)
Styrian (Styrian Slovene) (includes Maribor)
Carinthian (Carinthian Slovene)
Resian
Littoral (includes Koper and Piran)
Upper Carniolan (includes Ljubljana)
Lower Carniolan
Rovte
Transitional Slovene-Serbo-Croatian / Transitional Slovene-Kajkavian-Chakavian-Shtokavian (dialects do not follow a border defined by ethnic groups, people from the same ethnic group could speak different dialects with different dialect group affiliation)  
Kajkavian (Kajkavica / Kajkavština) (divergent enough from Standard Croatian, which is Shtokavian based, to be considered its own language)
Northwestern Kajkavian (Closed Ekavian) (several similarities with Slovene)
Southwestern Kajkavian (Closed Ekavian, transitional to Shtokavian)
Zagreb dialect (the traditional Kajkavian and Standard Shtokavian based Croatian overlap and coexist, Standard Croatian is not based on its capital dialect)
Eastern Kajkavian (Closed Ekavian, transitional to Shtokavian)
Border dialects (Transitional to Chakavian)
Lower Sutla (Ikavian, Kajkavised Chakavian speakers)
Prigorje (Closed Ekavian, Kajkavised Chakavian and Shtokavian speakers)
Gorski Kotar (Ikavian, transitional to Slovenian as well)
Kajkavian diaspora dialects
Kajkavian Burgenland Croatian (Gradišćanskohrvatski jezik) ("Burgenland Croatian" is an umbrella word for different dialects with different group affiliation) (spoken in Burgenland state, far eastern Austria, west of Hungary, between Slovenia to the south and Slovakia to the north, it does not border Croatia directly) (spoken by the Burgenland Croats, which originally came from the river Una valley)
Kajkavian Croatian Neusiedl dialect (some Croats speak a Kajkavian dialect near Lake Neusiedl)
Grob dialect (a Kajkavian dialect, spoken in Chorvátsky Grob in Slovakia)
Chakavian (Čakavica / Čakavština) (divergent enough from Standard Croatian, which is Shtokavian based, to be considered its own language)
Central
Central Chakavian / Middle Chakavian (Ikavian-Ekavian)
Central Chakavian diaspora dialects
Chakavian Burgenland Croatian Gradišćanskohrvatski jezik ("Burgenland Croatian" is an umbrella word for different dialects with different group affiliation) (spoken in Burgenland state, far eastern Austria, west of Hungary, between Slovenia to the south and Slovakia to the north, it does not border Croatia directly) (spoken by the Burgenland Croats, which originally came from the river Una valley)
Dolinci dialect (dialect of the Dolinci in Unterpullendorf, Frankenau, Kleinmutschen, etc. is a (middle) Chakavian dialect)
Poljan dialect (dialect of the Poljanci near Lake Neusiedl, is a (middle)Chakavian dialect)
Hac dialect (Chakavian dialect of Haci near Neusiedl)
Moravian Croat dialect (traditionally spoken by the Moravian Croats in Jevišovka, Dobré Pole and Nový Přerov in the South Moravian Region of the Czech Republic; historically it formed a slavic language enclave in a majority Central Bavarian of the Bavarian or Austro-Bavarian language area, which was included in the regions with ethnic German majority) (almost extinct)
Southern 
Southern Chakavian (Ikavian) (includes the traditional Split dialect)
Southeastern Chakavian / Lastovian (Ijekavian) (in Lastovo island)
Southwestern Istrian (Ikavian, Transitional to Shtokavian) (in Southwest Istria Peninsula)
Northern
Northern Chakavian (Ekavian) (includes the traditional Rijeka dialect)
Buzet (Closed Ekavian)
Shtokavian–(south)Chakavian mixed
Shtokavian–(south)Chakavian Burgenland Croatian (Gradišćanskohrvatski jezik) ("Burgenland Croatian" is an umbrella word for different dialects with different group affiliation) (spoken in Burgenland state, Gradišće in Croatian, far eastern Austria, west of Hungary, between Slovenia to the south and Slovakia to the north, it does not border Croatia directly) (spoken by the Burgenland Croats, which originally came from the river Una valley) 
Štoj dialect (dialect of the Croatian group Štoji – Güttenbach, Stinatz, Neuberg, is a Shtokavian–(south)Chakavian mixed dialect)
Shtokavian (Štokavski) (basis of Serbo-Croatian but not identical) (dialects do not follow a border defined by ethnic groups, people from the same ethnic group could speak different dialects with different dialect group affiliation)
Serbo-Croatian (Srpskohrvatski / Hrvatskosrpski – Cрпскохрватски / Xрватскосрпски) (standard language mainly based on Shtokavian, in modern time it has different standardization for Croatian, Serbian, Montenegrin and Bosnian as national languages, however they belong to the same dialect continuum and are mostly mutual intelligible)
Old-Shtokavian (older group of Shtokavian dialects, they are divided in west and east dialectal groups)
Old Western Shtokavian
Slavonian / Archaic Šćakavian (mixed yat reflexes) (in northern and southern Slavonia but not the central part, East part of Croatia)
Podravina (generally Closed Ekavian) (by the Drava river, in northern Slavonia)
Šokac (Šokački jezik)
Posavina (generally Ikavian) (by the Sava river, in southern Slavonia)
Baranja-Bačka (generally Ikavian) (in parts of Bačka)
East Bosnian / Jekavian-Šćakavian (Ijekavian-Ikavian) (spoken by many Bosniaks) (includes most part of Sarajevo and Tuzla)
Old Eastern Shtokavian
Zeta–Raška / Đekavian-Ijekavian (Zeta–South Sandžak) (East Montenegro and a corner of Southwest Serbia)
Zeta (Ijekavian) (in eastern part of Montenegro, including Podgorica)
Raška (in Raška) (Ijekavian) (spoken by many Kosovo Serbs of North Kosovo)
Sandžak Bosniak (Ijekavian) (in the Sandžak) (spoken by the Bosniaks of Serbia)
Resava-Kosovo / Older Ekavian (Ekavian)
Resava (Ekavian) (in East Central Serbia)
Kosovo (Ekavian) (spoken by several Kosovo Serbs of North Kosovo)
Smederevo-Vršac (Ekavian) (mainly in Smederevo region)
New Shtokavian / Neo-Shtokavian (younger group of Shtokavian dialects, they are divided in west, south and east dialectal groups)
New Western Shtokavian
Bosnian-Dalmatian / Western Ikavian / Younger Ikavian
Western Herzegovinian-Bosnian (Schakavian, Ikavian) (originated roughly in Western Herzegovina, has spread over a large area out of its initial home region) (spoken by many Croats of Bosnia and Herzegovina)
Narrow Western Herzegovinian / Western Herzegovinian Proper (includes west part of Mostar)
Bosnian (a specific dialect of Bosna river valley, not to be confused with Standard Bosnian) (includes Zenica)
Schakavian Burgenland Croatian (Gradišćanskohrvatski jezik) ("Burgenland Croatian" is an umbrella word for different dialects with different group affiliation) (spoken in Burgenland state, Gradišće in Croatian, far eastern Austria, west of Hungary, between Slovenia to the south and Slovakia to the north, it does not border Croatia directly) (spoken by the Burgenland Croats, which originally came from the river Una valley)
Vlah dialect (dialect of the Vlahi, is a Shtokavian dialect in Weiden bei Rechnitz, Zuberbach, Althodis, Schandorf, Dürnbach, Allersdorf, etc., is Shtokavian (schacavian) ikavian dialect similar to Slavonian)
Dalmatian / Shtokavian Dalmatian (Shtakavian, Ikavian) (Croatian Dalmatian) (not to be confused with the extinct Romance Dalmatian language)
Shtokavian Dalmatian dialect diaspora
Slavomolisano (Molise Croatian) (Na-Našu / Na-Našo) (spoken by the Molise Croats in enclaves in the Molise region of Southern Italy) (the southernmost old Croatian diaspora in Europe)
Bunjevac (Shtakavian, Ikavian) (in far northwestern Vojvodina) (an enclave of New Western Shtokavian)
New Southern Shtokavian
Southeastern
Eastern Herzegovinian (Istočnohercegovački / источнохерцеговачки) (in a broad sense) (Ijekavian) (it is the most widespread subdialect of the Shtokavian dialect of Serbo-Croatian, both by territory and the number of speakers) (it is the dialectal basis for all modern literary Serbo-Croatian standards: Bosnian, Croatian, Serbian, and Montenegrin, the latter only partially codified) (originated roughly in Eastern Herzegovina, has spread over a large area out of its initial home region)
Narrow Eastern Herzegovian / Eastern Herzegovian Proper (original area of Eastern Herzegovian in Western Montenegro and Eastern Herzegovina, Southeastern region of Bosnia and Herzegovina)
Užice / Užican / Zlatibor (Ijekavian, transitional to Šumadija–Vojvodina dialect) (in southwestern Serbia, Zlatibor Mountains, includes Čačak)
Southwestern
Dubrovnik subdialect (Ijekavian-Ikavian, transitional to Chakavian)
Boka-Peroj (Ijekavian-Ikavian, transtitional to Zeta-Raška) (in the Bay of Kotor region) 
Northwestern
Krajina (Ijekavian) (Krajina - "Borderland", is a slavic cognate with the name Ukraïna - Ukraine, with the same meaning) (spoken by many Bosnian Serbs and Croatian Serbs and also by many Croats in central Slavonia, includes most part of Banja Luka and Osijek)
Serbo-Croatian standards
Serbian (official language of Serbia called Serbian, accurately it is a Shtokavian standardized dialect part of its dialect continuum)
Croatian (official language of Croatia called Croatian, except for Kajkavian and Chakavian, accurately it is a standardized Shtokavian dialect part of its dialect continuum)
Bosnian (official language of Bosnia and Herzegovina called Bosnian, accurately it is a Standardized Shtokavian dialect part of its dialect continuum)
Montenegrin (official language of Montenegro called Montenegrin, accurately it is a Standardized Shtokavian dialect part of its dialect continuum)
New Eastern Shtokavian
Šumadija–Vojvodina / Younger Ekavian (Ekavian) (in Northern Serbia) (includes most part of Belgrade, Serbia's capital, Novi Sad and Kragujevac) (Standard Serbian is not based on its capital dialect)
Transitional West-East South Slavic
Torlakian (also belong to Old Shtokavian) (Торлачки / Торлашки – Torlački / Torlashki)
Serbian Torlakian (spoken in Southern Serbia, including Niš)
Timok-Prizren
South Morava-Prizren
West South Morava group
West South Morava proper
Janjevo-Letnica (traditionally in the southeastern part of Kosovo) (spoken by the Kosovo Croats that form Slavic language enclaves in Kosovo the same way as Kosovo Serbians)
Janjevo dialect (was spoken in Janjevo by the Janjevci, Kosovo Croats, a Croatian subgroup that speaks a Torlakian dialect)
Letnica dialect (spoken in several settlements historically inhabited by the Letničani, Kosovo Croats; they were Laramans, that is, crypto-Christians, specifically crypto-Catholics in their case, in the municipality of Viti, Kosovo; a Croatian subgroup that speaks a Torlakian dialect)
Prizren (spoken by many Kosovo Serbs of South Kosovo, including the Serbs of Prizren)
West South Morava dialect diaspora
Karashevski (spoken by the Krashovani, a Croatian subgroup that speaks a Torlakian dialect, in Banat, southwest Romania, a Slavic language enclave)
Svriljig-Zaplanje
Timok-Lužnica / Eastern Torlakian
Macedonian Torlakian / Northern Slavic Macedonian dialects (in Kumanovo, Kratovo, Kriva Palanka) (are closer to Torlakian and not to Standard Slavic Macedonian)
Eastern group
Kumanovo dialect
Kratovo dialect
Kriva Palanka dialect
Ovče Pole dialect
Western group
Skopska Crna Gora dialect
Tetovo dialect (Lower Polog) (overlaps with Albanian language area) 
Gora dialect (Našinski jezik) (spoken by the Gorani people in Gora region, an ethnic and linguistic Slavic majority region in far southern Kosovo)
Transitional Bulgarian dialects (transitional between Torlakian and Slavic Bulgarian but are considered closer to Torlakian) (in Belogradchik; Dimitrovgrad, Serbia; Godech; Tran; Bosilegrad)
Tran dialect
Breznik dialect
Belogradchik dialect
Bosilegrad dialect
Tsaribrod dialect / Dimitrovgrad dialect (of Bulgaria)
Eastern South Slavic / Southeast South Slavic (dialect continuum)
Old Eastern South Slavic / Old Slavonic / Old Slavic / Old Bulgarian (ⰔⰎⰑⰂⰡⰐⰠⰔⰍⰟ ⰧⰈⰟⰊⰍⰟ]] – Cловѣ́ньскъ ѩꙁꙑ́къ – Slověnĭskŭ Językŭ) (extinct) (the language that is inaccurately called Church Slavonic was not only or not exclusively a liturgical or sacred language as it was the Old Eastern South Slavic language, common ancestor of Slavic Bulgarian and Slavic Macedonian languages) (it was the neighbouring Slavic language of Greek to the North and was chosen by the Greek Christian Orthodox brothers from Thessaloniki, apostles Cyril and Methodius, to be the liturgical language used in their Christian preaching to the Slavs)
Old Church Slavonic (Црькъвьнословѣньскъ ѩзыкъ – Tsrĭkŭvĭnoslověnĭskŭ Językŭ) (the specific liturgical variant of Old Eastern South Slavic, it had several Greek language borrowings for several theological Christian concepts and ideas that were passed to other Slavic languages, especially those Slavic languages that were spoken by Christian Orthodox Slavs) (extinct)
Church Slavonic (Црькъвьнословѣньскъ ѩзыкъ – Tsrĭkŭvĭnoslověnĭskŭ Językŭ) (conservative Slavic liturgical or sacred language used by the Eastern Orthodox Church in several Slavic countries that descends from Old Church Slavonic) (contrary to the language called inaccurately Old Church Slavonic, accurately it is Old Eastern South Slavic, it is a specific liturgical or sacred language)
Bulgarian-Macedonian (Bulgarian and Macedonian belong to the same Eastern South Slavic dialect continuum with the difference that they are standardized languages based on specific dialects of the continuum, they are not simple dialects of one or the other)
Bulgarian (Slavic Bulgarian / Seven Tribes Slavic) (български – Bălgarski / языкъ словяньскъ – Jazykŭ Slovyanĭskŭ) (old east south Slavic people, the Seven Slavic tribes and other Slavic tribes, who called their own language simply as "Slavic", later adopted the adjective "Bulgarian" for the language based on the name of most of their ruling elite – the Bulgars, which were of Turkic non-Indo-European origin and founded the Bulgarian Empire)
Western Bulgarian
Northwestern
Vidin-Lom dialect
Byala Slatina-Pleven dialect
Southwestern
Vratsa dialect
Botevgrad dialect
Ihtiman dialect
Samokov dialect
Elin Pelin dialect
Sofia dialect (in Sofia, Bulgaria's capital)
Dupnitsa dialect
Kyustendil dialect
Macedonian (Slavic Macedonian / Vardar Slavic) (македонски / македонски Jазик – Makedonski / Makedonski Jazik) (often included in the Western Bulgarian dialects of the Eastern South Slavic dialect continuum) (old east south Slavic people, composed of several Slavic tribes, who called their own language simply as "Slavic", later adopted the adjective "Macedonian" for the language based on the name of the former East Roman Empire Province called Macedonia that had this name by reference of the ancient Hellenic people – the Macedonians, although most of the territory of Modern North Macedonia was Paeonia) (not to be confused with the Macedonian Greek dialect spoken by the Macedonian Greeks)
Eastern and Southern dialects
Eastern group
Maleševo-Pirin dialect / Pirin-Maleševo dialect / Blagoevgrad-Petrich dialect (Maleševo is in far eastern North Macedonia, Pirin is in far southwestern Bulgaria and corresponds to Blagoevgrad and Petrich areas)
Pirin (in the Pirin mountains)
Blagoevgrad dialect
Petrich dialect
Pianec-Kamenitsa-Kraishte dialect
Maleševo dialect
Štip-Kočani dialect
Strumica dialect
Tikveš-Mariovo dialect
Southern group (part of the Slavic dialects of Greece)
South-eastern group
Ser-Drama-Lagadin-Nevrokop dialect (includes Slavic speakers in Serres, Drama, Langada and Gotse Delchev)
Solun-Voden dialect / Kukush-Voden dialect / Lower Vardar dialect (includes Slavic speakers in Edessa / Voden and Thessaloniki / Solun, Greek Macedonia's capital) (lower Vardar or Axios river region)
Doyran dialect
South-western group
Kostur dialect (in Kastoria region, far northwestern Greek Macedonia)
Nestram-Kostenar dialect (in Nestorio area, far northwestern Greek Macedonia)
Korča (Gorica) dialect (in and around Korçë, southeastern Albania)
Western dialects
Central group
Prilep-Bitola dialect
Lerin dialect (in Florína / Lerin region)
Kičevo-Poreče dialect
Skopje-Veles dialect (includes Skopje, North Macedonia's capital)
Western proper and north western group
Western proper group
Lower Prespa dialect
Upper Prespa dialect
Ohrid dialect
Struga dialect
Vevčani-Radožda dialect (overlaps with Albanian language area)
Drimkol-Golo Brdo dialect (partially overlaps with Albanian in western areas)
North Western group
Debar dialect (partially overlaps with Albanian in northwestern areas)
Galičnik (Mala Reka) dialect (overlaps with Albanian language area)
Reka dialect (overlaps with Albanian language area)
Gostivar dialect / Upper Polog (overlaps with Albanian language area)
Macedonian Interdialect variety / Spoken Macedonian (based on the Western Slavic Macedonian dialects)
Standard Macedonian (Standard Slavic Macedonian) (based on the Western Slavic Macedonian dialects)
Eastern Bulgarian
Moesian (Northern / Northwestern) (in some areas it overlaps with Turkish language enclaves)
Shumen dialect
Balkan (Stara Planina) (Central)
Central Balkan dialect
Kotel-Elena-Dryanovo dialect
Panagyurishte dialect
Pirdop dialect
Teteven dialect
Erkech dialect
Subbalkan dialect
Transitional Balkan dialects
Rup (Southern / Southeastern) (in some areas it overlaps with Turkish language enclaves)
Strandzha dialect
Thracian dialect
Hvoyna dialect
Smolyan dialect / Central Rhodope dialect
Pomak dialect (spoken by most Pomaks)
Chepino dialect
Paulician dialect (in the region of Rakovski in southern Bulgaria and Svishtov in northern Bulgaria) (speakers of this dialect are mainly Catholic Christian Bulgarians)
Paulician dialect diaspora
Banat Bulgarian (a Slavic Bulgarian language enclave in the Banat, a region of southwestern Romania)
Zlatograd dialect
Babyak dialect
Razlog dialect
Other Traditional Bulgarian Diaspora dialects
Wallachian Bulgarian dialects (in enclaves in Wallachia / Muntenia)
Transylvanian Bulgarian dialects (in enclaves in Transylvania / Ardeal)
Anatolian Bulgarian dialect (in enclaves in northwestern Anatolia) (it was spoken by the Anatolian Bulgarians) (almost extinct)

Indo-Iranian languages

Proto-Indo-Iranian (extinct)

Iranian languages

Proto-Iranian
Old-Iranian (extinct)
Eastern Iranian languages
Old East Iranian (extinct)
Northeastern Iranian languages
Old Northeast Iranian
Scytho-Sarmatian
Scythian (extinct)
Sarmatian (extinct)
Alanic (extinct)
Ossetian (Iron and Digor are divergent enough to be considered two separate although closely related languages)
Iron Ossetian (Ирон – Iron or Ирон ӕвзаг – Iron ævzag)
Ir
Tagaur
Alagir
Kurtat
Digor Ossetian (дигорон – Digoron)
Digor Proper
Tual
Jassic (extinct) (Ossetic variant, more closely related to Digor, of a nomadic tribe, the Jassic people, settled in Hungary at the 13th century, in Jaszsag) (not to be confused with the language of the Iazyges, a related but separate language)
Scytho-Khotanese (Saka) (extinct)
Tumshuqese (extinct) (was spoken in the Tumxuk Kingdom)
Kanchaki (extinct) (was spoken in the Kashgar Kingdom / Shule Kingdom)
Khotanese ( Khotanai / Hvatanai / Gaustanai / Gostanai / Kustanai / Yūttinai) (extinct) (was spoken in the Kingdom of Khotan)
Southeastern Iranian languages
Old Southeast Iranian
Khwarazmian / Chorasmian (extinct) (was spoken in Khwarazm – Xwârazm or Xârazm, Xvairizem, Huwarazmish, from Kh(w)ar "Low" and Zam "Land") (closely related to Sogdian)
Old Sogdian
Sogdian (was spoken in Sogdiana and was the Silk Road's lingua franca in Central Asia) (extinct) (closely related to Khwarazmian)
North Sogdian
South Sogdian
Osrushana Sogdian (was spoken in Osrushana)
Yaghnobi language (йағнобӣ зивок – Yaɣnobī́ zivók) (Neo-Sogdian, New Sogdian, Modern Sogdian) (spoken in the upper valley of the Yaghnob River in the Zarafshan area of Tajikistan by the Yaghnobi people)
Western Yaghnobi
Eastern Yaghnobi
Avestan / Zend (Classical and sacred language of ancient Iran, language of Zoroastrian religion and of their sacred book – the Avesta) (extinct) (archaic Iranian language that was originally spoken in ancient Margiana, Aria, Bactria and Arachosia, roughly corresponding with a large part of today's Afghanistan, especially the northwest and north)
Old Avestan (extinct)
Younger Avestan (extinct)
Margian (was spoken in Margiana, roughly corresponding with most of today's Turkmenistan) (extinct)
Aryan of Aria (was spoken in Aria, roughly corresponding with today's Herat Province) (extinct)
Bactrian (Αριαο – Aryao = Aryā; αο = ao = ā) (extinct) (was spoken in Bactria – βαχλο – Bakhlo)
Munji-Yidgha (could descend from Bactrian or was part of an Eastern Iranian dialect chain intermediate between Bactrian and other Iranian languages such as Old Pashto) (classified as Pamir languages because of geographical position not genealogical)
Munji (مونجى – Munji)
Northern Munji (Mamalghan)
Southern Munji (Munjan)
Yidgha (یدغہ – Yidgha)
Sarghulami (extinct)
Shughni-Yazgulami (classified as Pamir languages because of geographical position not genealogical)
Vanji-Yazgulami
Vanji / Old Wanji (extinct) (it was spoken in the Vanj River valley in what is now the Gorno-Badakhshan)
Yazgulyam (Yuzdami zevég)
Lower Yazgulami
Upper Yazgulami
Rushani
Oroshori (Roshorvi)
Shughni / Khughni (Shughni Proper) (хуг̌ну̊н зив – Xuǧnůn ziv)
Khufi (divergent enough from Shughni to be considered a separate language although closely related to it)
Bartangi (divergent enough from Shughni to be considered a separate language although closely related to it)
Sarikoli / Tashkorghani (Tоҷик зив – Tujik ziv / Sariqöli Ziv) (although the language is also called Tajik, as the people who speak it, in Taxkorgan Tajik Autonomous County, Far Southwest Xinjiang, West China, it's not Tajik and is more closely related to the Eastern Iranian ones) (it is a remnant of the Iranian languages once spoken in Xinjiang or East Turkistan) (spoken by the Sarikol – Tajiks of Xinjiang)
Sanglechi-Ishkashimi / Zebaki (classified as Pamir languages because of geographical position not genealogical)
Sanglechi (Sanglechi-Warduji)
Ishkashimi (Škošmī zəvuk / Rənīzəvuk)
Afghanistan Ishkashimi
Tajikistan Ishkashimi
Wakhi (وخی – x̌ik zik) (it is spoken mainly in the Wakhan Corridor) (classified as Pamir languages because of geographical position not genealogical) (seem to have Saka influence)
Ormuri-Parachi
Ormuri (زبان ارموری – Oormuri, Urmuri, Bargista, Baraks, and Baraki)
Kaniguram (in Kaniguram Valley, South Waziristan, F.A.T.A., Northwest Pakistan)
Baraki-Barak (in Baraki Barak town, Baraki Barak District, Logar Province, Southeastern Afghanistan)
Parachi (mainly in the upper part of Nijrab District, northeast of Kabul)
Drangian (was spoken in Drangiana) (extinct)
Arachosian (was spoken in Arachosia) (extinct)
Old Pakhto
Pakhto / Pashto / Pathan (پښتو – Pax̌tō / Pashtō) (dialect continuum)
Northern Pashto (Pakhto) (Northern variety) (Northern-Central Pakhto) (Yusufzai) ( یوسفزئی پښتو – Pax̌tō) (divergent enough to be considered a separate language with its own dialects, although closely related to the other Pakhto or Pashto languages)
Northern dialect (or Eastern dialect) (Northern Proper/Eastern Proper)
Yusufzai dialect (or Northeastern dialect)
Northern Karlani group
Taniwola dialect
Khosti dialect
Zadran dialect
Bangash dialect (spoken by the Bangash)
Afridi dialect (spoken by the Afridi)
Khogyani dialect
Wardak dialect
Transitional Northern-Southern Pashto
Central Pashto (Ghilji Pakhto) (or Northwestern dialect) (منځنۍ پښتو – Manźanəi Pax̌to) (divergent enough to be considered a separate language with its own dialects, although closely related to the other Pakhto or Pashto languages) (Basis of Standard Pakhto/Pashto but not identical)
Southern Pashto (Pashto) (Southern variety) (Southwestern Pashto) (Kandahari Pashto) (کندهارۍ پښتو – Kandahari Pashto)
Durrani dialect (or Southern dialect) (Southern Proper)
Kakar dialect (or Southeastern dialect)
Shirani dialect
Marwat-Bettani dialect (spoken by the Marwat and the Bettani)
Southern Karlani group
Dawarwola dialect
Khattak dialect
Bannuchi dialect (spoken by the Bannuchi) Tsalga
Wazirwola dialect (in Waziristan)
Masidwola dialect (spoken by the Mehsuds / Masid)
Wanetsi (Tarīnō / Chalgarī) (وڼېڅي – Waṇētsī; ترينو – Tarīnō; څلګري – Tsalgarī) (an archaic and divergent Pakhto/Pashto variety) (divergent enough to be considered a separate language with its own dialects, although closely related to the other Pakhto or Pashto languages)
Gedrosian (was spoken in Gedrosia / Gwadar / Maka?, roughly corresponding with today's Makran, Balochistan) (extinct)
Western Iranian languages
Old West Iranian (extinct)
Northwestern Iranian languages / Northern Western Iranian
Median / Medic (was the language of the Medes) (extinct)
Northwestern I
Kurdish (dialect continuum)
Laki (لکي – Lekî)
Pish-e Kuh Laki
Posht-e Kuh Laki
Southern Kurdish (Pehlewani, Palewani, Xwarig / Xwarîn) (کوردی خوارین – Kurdîy Xwarîn)
Bayray
Feyli (spoken by the Feyli tribe)
Garrusi (Bijari) (Gerrûsî) (Bîcarî)
Kermanshahi
Kolyai
Kordali
Malekshahi (Melikşayî)
Sanjabi (Sanjâbi / Sincawî) (spoken by the Sanjâbi)
Kalhori (Kelhûrî) (spoken by the Kalhor)
Zangana
Central Kurdish (Sorani) (کوردیی ناوەندی – Kurdîy Nawendî) (سۆرانی – Soranî)
Mukriyani/Mokriyani (spoken south of Lake Urmia with Mahabad as its center)
Hawleri (spoken in and around the city of Hawler (Erbil) in Iraqi Kurdistan, in Hawler (Erbil) Governorate and Oshnavieh in Iran)
Ardalani (spoken in the cities of Sanandaj, Saqqez, Marivan, Kamyaran, Divandarreh and Dehgolan in Kordestan province and the Kurdish speaking mores of Tekab and Shahindej in West Azerbaijan province) (in Ardalan region)
Wermawi
Garmiani / Germiyani
Jafi (spoken in the towns of Javanroud, Ravansar, Salas-e Babajani and some villages around Paveh, Sarpole Zahab and the parts of Kermanshah City)
Babani (spoken in Sulaymaniyah and around this city, in Iraq, and the city of Baneh, in Iran) (in Baban)
Northern Kurdish (Kurmanji) (Kurmancî – کورمانجی / Кӧрманщи – Kӧrmanshchi / Kurdiya Jorîn – کوردیا ژۆرین / Êzdîkî)
Southeastern Kurmanji (Badînî / Botani / Boti) (spoken in the Hakkâri province of Turkey and Dohuk Governorate of Iraqi Kurdistan)
Hekari
Shemdinani (in Shamdinli / Şemdinli)
Southern Kurmanji (spoken in the Al-Hasakah Governorate in Syria, the Sinjar district in Iraq, and in several adjacent parts of Turkey centering on the Mardin and Batman provinces) (includes Hewler/Diyarbakır)
Southwestern Kurmanji (spoken in the Adıyaman/Semsûr, Gaziantep/Entab and Şanlıurfa provinces of Turkey and the Aleppo Governorate of Syria)
Northwestern Kurmanji (spoken in the Kahramanmaraş, in Kurmanji: Meraş, Malatya – Meletî, and Sivas – Sêwaz provinces of Turkey)
Marashi
Northern Kurmanji / Serhed Kurdish (spoken mainly in the Ağrı (Agirî), Erzurum (Erzerom) and Muş (Mûş) provinces of Turkey, as well as adjacent areas)
Shikakî
Bayezidi
Anatolian Kurmanji (spoken in Central Anatolia, especially in Konya, Ankara, Aksaray, by the Kurds of Central Anatolia)
Ashiti
Silivî
Mihemedî
Zaza-Gorani
Zaza (Dimlî) (Zazaki / Kirmanjki)
Northern Zaza (Northern Dimlî) (Northern Zazaki / Northern Kirmanjki)
West-Dersim
East-Dersim
Varto
Sarız
Koçgiri
Southern Zaza (Southern Dimlî) (Southern Zazaki / Southern Kirmanjki)
Sivereki
Kori
Hazzu
Motki
Dumbuli
Eastern / Central Zazaki
Dersimki
Gorani (گۆرانی – Goranî) (spoken in the Hawraman region, western Iran, Iranian Kurdistan, and northeastern Iraq, Iraqi Kurdistan)
Hawrami (Avromani)
Bajelani
Sarli
Shabaki (شەبەکی – Shabaki)
Northwestern II
Tatic
Tati-Azari/Tati/Azari
Old Azeri / Azari (آذری – Āḏarī) (extinct)
Tati ( اتی زبون – Tâti Zobun)
South Qazvin province
Takestani (Qazvin)
Eshtehardi
Chāli
Dānesfāni
Esfarvarini
Ebrāhim-Ābādi
Sagz-Ābādi
Ziārāni Tāti
Kiliti (extinct)
Ziārāni Tāti
Tikhuri Tāti/Tikhvur Tati (in Tikhor / Tikhvor)
Ardabil province
Ardabilaki Tāti
Khalkhal
Alborz mountains range
Damāvandi (in Damavand, Iran)
Old Tehrani (modern Tehrani is a Persian dialect)
North Khorasan province
Khorāsāni
Southern Tati / Ramandi ( اتی زبون – Tâti Zobun)
Harzandi / Harzani (هرزندی، هرزنی – Harzani)
Karingani
Kho'ini / Xo'ini (دیه زواَن – Die Zuan)
Upper Taromi
Kabatei
Rudbari
Taromi
Talysh
Talysh (Talışi – Толыши – تالشه زَوُن)
Southern-Central Talyshi
South Talyshi
Central Talyshi
Northern Talyshi
Gozarkhani
Kajali (nearly extinct)
Koresh-e Rostam (nearly extinct)
Maraghei (مراغی، مراقی – Maraghei)
Dikini
Razajerdi (nearly extinct)
Shahrudi (nearly extinct)
Transitional Tati-Talysh-Central Iran
Tafresh
Tafresh-Ashtiani
Tafresh
Ashtiani (آشتیانی – Ashtianī)
Vafsi (ووسی – Vowsī)
Alviri-Vidari
Alviri (in Alvir)
Vidari (in Vidar)
Judeo-Hamadani (Judeo-Median of Hamadan) (traditionally spoken in Hamadan, old Ecbatana) (nearly extinct)
Central Iran / Central Plateau (Kermanic)
Northwestern Central Iran/Northwest Central Plateau
Khunsari (Khusaari)
Mahallati
Vanishani
Judeo-Golpaygani (Judeo-Median of Golpayegan) (extinct)
Southwestern Central Iran / Southwestern Central Plateau
Gazi
Sedehi
Ardestani
Nohuji
Sajzi
Jarquya’i
Rudashti
Kafrudi
Kafruni
Judeo-Esfahani (Judeo-Median of Esfahan) (traditionally spoken in Esfahan / Ispahan)
Northeastern Central Iran / Northeast Central Plateau
Arani
Bidgoli
Delijani
Nashalji
Abuzaydabadi (Bizovoy / Bizovoyja)
Qohrudi
Badrudi
Kamu’i
Jowshaqani
Meyma’i
Abyana’i
Soi / Sohi
Badi
Natanzi (spoken in Natanz, Natanz County, Isfahan Province, Central Iran)
Natanzi Proper
Farizandi
Yarandi / Yarani
Kasha’i
Tari
Tarqi
Judeo-Kashani (Judeo-Median of Kashan)
Southeastern Central Iran / Southeastern Central Plateau
Zoroastrian Dari (گویش بهدینان / دری زرتشتی – Behdīnānī)
Yazdi
Kermani
Nayini / Na'ini / Biyabanak
Anaraki
Zefra’i
Varzenei
Tudeshki
Keyjani
Abchuya’i
Kavir
Khuri
Balochi (بلۏچی – Balòči / Balòci) (dialect continuum) (Southeast Iranian East Iranian substrate)
Northern Baloch (Mandwani)
Western Baloch
Rakhshani (Raxshani)
Sarawani / Saravani
Sarhadi / Sarhaddi
Panjguri
Kalati
Eastern Baloch
Sulaimani
Southern Baloch (Dombki / Domki)
Lashari
Coastal Balochi
Makrani (Lotuni)
Las Bela (in Lasbela District)
Kachi / Kechi (Keci)
Koroshi / Koroshi Balochi (کوروشی – Koroshi)
Parthian (Arsacid Pahlavi) (Pahlawānīg) (extinct)
Northwestern III
Caspian (dialect continuum) (possible Kartvelian / South Caucasian influence or substrate)
Semnani
Semnani proper (Semani zefön)
Biyabunaki
Sangsari / Sangisari
Lasgerdi-Sorkhei
Lasgerdi
Sorkhei
Aftari
Old Tabari (extinct) (a separate language from Mazanderani / Amardian that was assimilated) (it was spoken by the Tapuri)
Mazanderani (Amardian) / Tabari (Tapuri) (مازندرانی – Mazandarani / طبری – Tabari) (Mazanderani people traditionally also call their language Gilaki as the Gilaks also call their language)
Gorgani (extinct)
Main Mazandarani
Baboli
Amoli
Nuri
Chaloosi
Saravi
Ghaemshahri
Ghasrani
Damavandi
Firoozkoohi
Astarabadi
Katouli
Shahsavari
Shahmirzadi
Royan Mazanderani
Mazandarani-Gilaki / Gilani
Deylami / Daylami (Galechi) (دیلمی – Deilami) (extinct)
Gilaki (گیلکی – Giləki)
Western Gilaki
Eastern Gilaki
Galeshi
Southwestern Iranian languages/Southern Western Iranian (dialect continuum)
Old Persian (𐎠𐎼𐎹 – Ariya) (extinct)
Middle Persian (𐭯𐭠𐭫𐭮𐭩𐭪 – Pārsīk or Pārsīg) (extinct)
Persian (New Persian) (فارسی – Fārsi / پارسی – Pārsi / форсӣ – Forsī)
Iranian Persian (Western Persian) (فارسی – Fārsi / پارسی – Pārsi)
Southwest Western Persian (in Fars / Pars, Bushehr and far western Hormozgan provinces, where Persian language, Farsi / Parsi, had its origin)
Shirazi
Bushehri
Bandari Persian (not to be confused with Bandari)
West Western Persian / Mesopotamian Persian
Ahvazi
Abadani
Khorramshahri
Karbalai
Central Western Persian (Median substrate)
Esfahani / Ispahani
Araki
Kashani
Yazdi
Kermani
North Western Persian (Median substrate)
Tehrani (Modern Tehrani) (basis of Standard Iranian Persian in Iran)
Qazvini
Northeast Western Persian / Khorasani Persian (Parthian substrate)
Mashhadi
Dzhidi (Judeo-Persian)
Afghanistan Persian / Dari Persian (Eastern Persian) (Southeast Iranian East Iranian substrate)
Afghanistan Persian (Dari Proper) (دری – Darī / فارسی دری – Fārsī-ye Darī)
Sistani (in Sistan)
Herati (in Herat)
Mazari (in Mazar / Mazar-i-Sharif, Balkh Province)
Badakhshi (in Badakhshan)
Panjshiri (in Panjshir Valley)
Kaboli (in Cabul) (basis for Standard Dari in Afghanistan)
Laghmani (in Laghman Province)
Pahlavni / Pahlavani (extinct)
Aimaq / Aimaqi / Aimaq Persian (ایماقی – Aimaq) (several borrowings from Mongolic and Turkic but much less significant than Hazaragi)
Firozkohi
Jamshidi (Jamshedi]], Djamchidi, Yemchidi, or Dzhemshid)
Maliki
Mizmast
Taimani Aimaq
Zainal
Zohri / Zuri
Changezi
Taimuri (Teimuri, Timuri, or Taimouri)
Hazaragi / Hazaragi Persian (Hazāragī) (آزرگی – Azaragi) (significant borrowings from Mongolic and Turkic) (spoken by the Hazara, their origin is in Persianized Turkic and Mongolian peoples mixed with native Iranian peoples of Central Afghanistan)
Tajik / Tajiki Persian (Northeast Persian) (забо́ни тоҷикӣ́ – Zabóni Tojikī / форси́и тоҷикӣ́ – Forsíi Tojikī) (Bactrian substrate)
Southern dialects (South and East of Dushanbe, Kulob / Kulyab, and the Rasht region of Tajikistan) (today tends to be the basis of Standard Tajiki but not identical)
Southeastern dialects (dialects of the Darvoz region and the Amu Darya near Rushon)
Central dialects (dialects of the upper Zarafshan Valley)
Northern dialects (Sughd, Northern Tajikistan, Bukhara, Samarkand, Kyrgyzstan, and the Varzob valley region of Dushanbe) (once was the basis of Standard Tajiki)
Bukhori (Judeo-Bukharic, Judeo-Persian of Bukhara) (בוכארי – бухорӣ – Buxorī / Bukhori) (traditionally spoken by Bukharian Jews in Bukhara, now mainly in Israel)
Tat / Caucasus Tat / Persian Tat (Zuhun Tati)
Muslim/Christian Tat (Zuhun Tati)
Aruskush-Daqqushchu
Lahyj
Balakhani
Devechi
Qyzyl Qazma
Qonaqkend
Absheron
Surakhani
Northern Tats
Malham
Quba
Armeno-Tati (spoken by the Armeno-Tats)
Judeo-Tat / Judeo-Persian Tat (Juhuri / Juvuri) (Çuhuri – жугьури – ז׳אוּהאוּראִ) (traditional language of the Mountain Jews)
Persid / Southern Zagros
Northwestern Fars-Sivandi
Northwestern Fars
Sivandi (زووآن ئ سیوندی – Sivandi)
Kuhmareyi
Davani dialect (Devani) (دوانی – Davāni)
Luri (لۊری – Lurī)
Southern Luri
Mamasani
Kohkiluyeh / Kohgīlūya
Boir-Aḥmadī
Northern Luri / Central Luri (Minjai)
Bakhtiari (بختیاری – Bakhtiarī)
Khuzestani Persian
Southern Khuzestani Persian
Behbahani
Ramhormozi
Hendijani
Mahshahri
Qanavati
Larki
Bahmeei
Northern Khuzestani Persian (Dezfuli / Shushtari)
Dezfuli
Shushtari
Gotvandi
Larestani–Gulf (Larestani-Persian Gulf)
Larestani
Lari (Larestani / Achomi / Ajami) (اَچُمی – Achomi / خودمونی – Khodmoni)
Judeo-Shirazi (Judeo-Persian of Shiraz)
Gulf (Persian Gulf)
Bandari
Minabi
Bashkardi / Bashagerdi / Bashaka
North Bashkardi
South Bashkardi
Kumzari (in the Straits of Hormuz)
Laraki (in Larak Island, Iran)
Shihuhi (in Kumzar village, Musandam Peninsula, Far Northern Oman)
Sagartian (was spoken in Sagartia) (extinct)
Carmanian (was spoken in Carmania, roughly corresponding with the modern province of Kerman) (extinct)
Utian (was spoken in Utia, roughly corresponding with today's southeastern Iran) (extinct)

Nuristani languages (Kamozian)

Transitional Iranian-Indo-Aryan
(older name: Kafiri) (according to some scholars there is the possibility that the older name "Kapisi" that was synonymal of Kambojas, related to the ancient Kingdom of Kapisa, in modern-day Kapisa Province, changed to "Kafiri" and came to be confused and assimilated with "kafiri", meaning "infidel" in Arabic and used in Muslim religion)

Proto-Nuristani (extinct) (identical with Proto-Kamboja? – Kambojas or Komedes language?)
Southern (Kalasha)
Askunu (Âṣkuňu-veːri)
Ashuruveri / Askunu Proper (Âṣkuňu-veːri) (Kolata, Titin, Bajaygul, Askugal, Majegal)
Bâźâigal
Kolatâ˜
Titin
Gramsukraviri (Grâmsaňâ-viːri) (Gramsaragram, Acanu)
Suruviri (Saňu-viːri) (Wamai, Wama)
Waigali (Kalaṣa-alâ)
Kalasha-ala / Waigali (Kalaṣa-alâ)
Waigali / Waigali Proper (Varǰan-alâ)
Vä-alâ (Vai-alâ)
Ameš-alâ
ǰâmameš-alâ
ẓö˜č-alâ
Čima-Nišei (Čimi-alâ – Nišei-alâ)
Nišei-alâ
Čimi-alâ
Tregami-Zemiaki
Tregami (Tregâmi) (in the Tregâm Valley of the lower Pech River, in the Watapur District of Kunar Province in Afghanistan)
Katar
Gambir
Zemiaki (J̌amlám-am bašá) (in Zemyaki village)
Northern (Kamkata-Vasi)
Kamkata-vari (Kati) (Kâmvʹiri, Kâtʹa-vari, Mum-viri, Kṣtʹa-vari)
Kata-vari (Kât'a-vari)
Western Kata-vari (Kât'a-vari)
Kt'ivřâ·i vari
Eastern Kata-vari (Kât'a-vari)
Kamviri (Kâmv'iri)
Mumviri (Mumv'iri)
Shekhani
Vasi-vari / Wasi-wari (Prasuni) (Vâsi-vari) (in the Pârun Valley)
Uṣ'üt-var'e
Üš'üt-üć'ü-zum'u-vari
ṣup'u-var'i

Indo-Aryan languages

Proto-Indo-Aryan (extinct)
Old Indo-Aryan (extinct)
Mitanni-Aryan (a far western Indo-Aryan language spoken in Mitanni, Northern Mesopotamia and Levant, along with Hurrian, that was a non Indo-European language)
Early Old Indo-Aryan – Vedic Sanskrit / Rigvedic Sanskrit
Late Old Indo-Aryan – Sanskrit (संस्कृतम् – Saṃskṛtam) (Classical Sanskrit) (Classical and High culture language of South Asia, mainly of Hinduism, Hindu philosophy and also of Buddhism and Jainism) (includes Epic Sanskrit) (revived language with 26 490 first language (L1) or mother tongue speakers and increasing) (living language and not extinct)
Middle Indo-Aryan (Prakrits) (extinct)
Dardic (a more geographical rather than linguistic genealogical group)
Gandhari Prakrit (extinct)
Niya Prakrit / Kroraina Prakrit / Niya Gāndhārī (administrative language of the Shanshan or Kroraina or Loulan kingdom, on the southern route of the Silk Road, in the southern rim of the Tarim Basin, in today's southern and southeastern Xinjiang) (it used the Kharoshthī script) (it has a possible Tocharian language, Tocharian C, as substrate) (extinct)
Chitral languages (dialect continuum)
Kalasha-mun (Kalashamondr) (has no close connection to Waigali or Kalasha-ala, that although related, belongs to another branch – Nuristani)
Khowar (Chitrali) (کهووار – Khō-wār)
Standard Khowar
Swati Khowar (Swat Kohistan)
Lotkuhiwar (Lotkuh Valley / Gramchashma Valley)
Gherzikwar (Ghizer Valley)
Gilgiti Khowar (Gilgit-Baltistan) (spoken by a few families in Gilgit city)
Kashmiri / Koshur (कॉशुर – كٲشُر – Kashmiri)
Kashtawari / Kishtwari (Kashmiri standard)
Poguli
Rambani
Kohistani languages (dialect continuum)
Bateri (बटेरी – Bateri)
Chilisso
Gowro / Gabaro
Indus Kohistani (Maiya, Shutun, Abasin Kohistani)
Indus Kohistani dialect (Jijal, Mani, Pattan, Seo)
Duber-Kandia (Khili, Manzari)
Kanyawali
Kalami / Gawri (Garwi, Bashkarik) (کالامي – Kalami / ګاوری – Gawri)
Tirahi / Dardù (nearly extinct)
Torwali (توروالی – Torwali)
Bahrain
Chail
Wotapuri-Katargalai (extinct)
Wotapuri
Katarqalai
Pashayi / Pashai (a small group of four separate but closely related languages, not only a single language) (dialect continuum)
Southwest Pashayi
Ishpi
Isken
Tagau dialects
Southeast Pashayi
Damench
Laghmani
Sum
Upper and Lower Darai Nur
Wegali dialects
Northwest Pashayi
Alasai
Bolaghain
Gulbahar
Kohnadeh
Laurowan
Najil
Nangarach
Pachagan
Pandau
Parazhghan
Pashagar
Sanjan
Shamakot
Shutul
Uzbin
Wadau dialects
Northeast Pashayi
Aret
Chalas (Chilas)
Kandak
Korangal
Kurdar dialects
Kunar languages (dialect continuum)
Dameli
Gawar-Bati / Narsati / Aranduyiwar
Nangalami / Grangali (Nangalami-Grangali)
Grangali
Nangalami (Ningalami) (extinct)
Shumashti
Shina languages (dialect continuum)
Palula / Phalura / Ashreti (پالولہ – Palula)
Sawi / Savi / Sauji
Kalkoti / Goedijaa
Ushoji / Ushojo
Kundal Shahi (کنڈل شاہی – Kundal Shahi)
Shina (ݜݨیاٗ – Šiṇyaá)
Gilgiti (the prestige dialect)
Astori
Chilasi Kohistani
Drasi
Gurezi
Kohistani Shina (ݜݨیاٗ – Šiṇyaá) (a divergent variety of Shina, divergent enough to be considered a separate language although closely related to it)
Palasi (Palas)
Jalkoti (Jalkot)
Kolai (Koli)
Brokskat / Dah-Hanu (Shina of Baltistan, Dras and Ladakh)
Domaaki / Dumaki (in Nager and Hunza, among the Burushaski, Wakhi and Shina speakers) (historically it was a language of the North Indian plains, affiliated to the Central Group of New Indo-Aryan languages whose speakers migrated towards north) (Central Indo-Aryan substrate that is a distant relative of the languages spoken by the Doma/Roma)
Nager-Domaaki
Hunza-Domaaki
North-Western Indo-Aryan (dialect continuum)
Punjabi languages (spoken in the Punjab – Panj-āb / Panchnada, Pañca-áp – "Five Waters" i.e. Five Rivers, Land of Five Rivers)
Lahnda / Western Punjabi
Pahari-Pothwari / Pothohari
Pothwari / Pothohari (پوٹھواری – Pothwari / پوٹھوہاری – Pothohari) (spoken in Pothohar Plateau, parts of the districts of Rawalpindi, Jhelum, Chakwal and Gujrat, Mirpur District)
Mirpuri (in Mirpur District)
Pahari / Dhundi-Kairali
Pahari Proper (پہاڑی – Pahari)
Chibhālī
Poonchi / Punchhi (پونچھی – Poonchi)
Baghi
Muzaffarabadi
Parmi
Hindko (Panjistani) (ہندکو – Hindko)
Northern Hindko
Hazara Hindko / Kaghani (not to be confused with the Hazara language and people which have a different origin)
Southern Hindko
Peshawari
Central Hindko
Chhachi / Chacchi / Chachi
Kohati
Awankari
Ghebi
Saraiki (سرائیکی – Sarā'īkī)
Derawali (spoken in Derajat region, in central Pakistan, Dera Ismail Khan District)
Thali (Northern Saraiki) (spoken in the district of Dera Ismail Khan and the northern parts of the Thal region, including Mianwali District)
Central Saraiki (including Multani: spoken in the districts of Dera Ghazi Khan, Muzaffargarh, Leiah, Multan and Bahawalpur)
Multani
Riasti/Bhawalpuri/Choolistani
Southern Saraiki (prevalent in the districts of Rajanpur and Rahimyar Khan)
Sindhi Saraiki (dispersed throughout the province of Sindh)
Punjabi (Punjabi Proper) (پنجابی – ਪੰਜਾਬੀ – Pañjābī)
Standard Punjabi
Transitional Saraiki-Punjabi or part of Western Punjabi
Western Punjabi/Eastern Saraiki (transitional to Punjabi and spoken in the Bar region along the boundary with the eastern Majhi dialect, this group includes the dialects of Jhangi and Shahpuri)
Dhani
Shahpuri
Jhangochi / Changvi / Jhangvi / Rachnavi
Jangli
Chenavari
Transitional Western-Eastern Punjabi (but has more similarities with Western Punjabi)
Majhi (basis of Standard Punjabi but not identical)
Eastern Punjabi
Doabi
Puadhi / Pawadhi / Poadhi
Malwai / Malwi
Bathi
Bhatiani
Lubanki / Labanki (extinct) (it was spoken by the Labana tribe
Jakati / Jataki (extinct) (it was spoken by several small, supposedly Roma ethnic groups, Jāt, in Afghanistan)
Transitional Punjabi-Sindhi
Khetrani / Jafri (Khetrānī) (it is spoken by the majority of the Khetrans, an Indo-Aryan origin people assimilated by the Baloch and considered a Baloch tribe) (earlier suggestion that Khetrani might be a remnant of a Dardic language)
Sindhi languages
Sindhi (Sindhi Proper) (سنڌي – सिन्धी – ਸਿੰਧੀ – Sindhī)
Siroli / Northern Sindhi / "Siraiki"
Vicholi
Lari
Thareli
Macharia
Dukslinu
Kathiawari Katchi
Muslim Sindhi
Lasi (part of Sindhi proper or a separate language although closely related)
Jadgali (Nummaṛī / Nummaṛikī) (close to Sindhi) (an Indo-Aryan origin people assimilated by the Baloch and considered a Baloch tribe or an Iranian people speaking an Indo-Aryan language) (spoken on the Iranian plateau)
Sindhi Bhil (part of Sindhi proper or a separate language although closely related)
Memoni / Kathiawadi (spoken by the Memon people)
Kachchi / Kutchi (કચ્છી – ڪڇي – کچھی – Kachhi) (in the Kutch District, Northwest Gujarat, West India)
Mithi boli
Khadi boli (Kutch)
Jamnagari boli
Maliya boli
Ahir boli
Chirai boli
Jain boli
Luwati / Lawati / (Khojki) (in coastal Oman, eastern Arabian Peninsula)
Northern Indo-Aryan (dialect continuum)
Western Pahari (Dogri-Kangri) (Himachali)
Dogri-Kangri
Dogri (डोगरी – ڈوگرى – ḍogrī) (spoken in Jammu)
Kangri (कांगड़ी – Kangri)
Mandeali / Chambeali
Standard Mandeali
Sarkaghat
Mandeali Pahari
Kullu / Kulvi (Kullū / Kuluī)
Jaunsari (जौनसारी – Jaunsari)
Pahari Kinnauri (Harijan Kinnauri / Kinnauri Himachali)
Sirmauri (Sirmauri Himachali)
Dharthi (Giriwari)
Giripari
Hinduri / Handuri
Mahasu Pahari (Mahasui / Mahasuvi)
Lower Mahasu Pahari
Baghati
Baghliani
Kiunthali
Upper Mahasu Pahari
Rampuri/Kochi
Rohruri / Soracholi / Sodochi
Shimla Siraji
Central Pahari
Garhwali (गढ़वळि भाख – Garhwali)
Srinagariya (classical Garhwali spoken in erstwhile royal capital, Srinagar, accepted as Standard Garhwali by most scholars)
Chandpuriya (spoken in Chandpur region, area in Chamoli district)
Tihriyali / Gangapariya (spoken in Tehri Garhwal)
Badhani (spoken in Chamoli Garhwal)
Dessaulya
Lohabbya
Majh-Kumaiya (spoken at the border of Garhwal and Kumaon)
Nagpuriya (spoken in Rudraprayag district)
Rathi (spoken in Rath area of Pauri Garhwal)
Salani (spoken in Talla Salan, Malla Salan and Ganga Salan parganas of Pauri)
Ranwalti (spoken in Ranwain, the Yamuna valley of Uttarkashi)
Bangani (spoken in Bangaan area of Uttarkashi)
Jaunpuri (spoken in Uttarkashi and Tehri districts)
Gangadi (spoken in Uttarkashi)
Chaundkoti (spoken in Pauri)
Parvati (reportedly not mutually intelligible with other dialects) (could be a separate language from Garhwali, although closely related)
Kumaoni (कुमाँऊनी – Kumaoni)
Western Kumaoni
Central Kumaoni (Kali)
North-Eastern Kumaoni
South-Eastern Kumaoni
Doteli / Dotyali (डोटेली – Dotyali)
Doteli Proper
Baitadeli
Darchuli
Bajhangi / Bajhangi Nepali
Eastern Pahari
Jumli (closely related to Nepali)
Chaudhabis
Sinja (Khas Bhasa) (in Jumla, Western Nepal)
Asi
Paanchsai
Palpa (closely related to Nepali) (extinct)
Nepali / Khas Kura / Parbatiya / Gorkhali (नेपाली / खस कुरा – Nepali / Khas Kurā) (origin in Gorkha Kingdom, today's western Nepal) (spoken by the Khas / Khas Arya people of Nepal)
Achhami / Acchami
Baitadeli
Bajhangi
Bajurali
Bheri
Dadeldhuri
Dailekhi
Darchulali
Darchuli
Gandakeli
Humli
Purbeli
Soradi
Jhapali
Syangjali
Western Indo-Aryan (dialect continuum)
Gurjar apabhraṃśa (or Old Western Rajasthani / Old Gujarati: common ancestor of Gujarati and Rajasthani)
Rajasthani (राजस्थानी - Rājasthānī)
Marwari
Marwari / Marwari Proper (मारवाड़ी – Mārwāṛī) (Marwadi / Marvadi) (spoken mainly in west Rajasthan state)
Dhatki / Thari (धाटकी – ڍاٽڪي – Dhatki) (spoken mainly in western parts of Jaisalmer and Barmer districts of Rajasthan, India and also in Sindh, Pakistan)
Central Dhatki
Eastern Dhatki
Southern Dhatki
Barage
Malhi
Mewati (मेवाती – Mewati) (spoken mainly in Mewat Region)
Nuh Godwari language
Alwari
Dhundari / Jaipuri (ढूण्ढाड़ी / ઢૂણ્ઢાડ઼ી – Dhundari) (spoken in the Dhundhar region of northeastern Rajasthan state, India)
Mewari (spoken in Rajsamand, Bhilwara, Udaipur, and Chittorgarh districts of Rajasthan state of India)
Shekhawati (spoken in the districts of Jhunjhunu, Sikar, Churu and a part of Nagaur and Jaipur, North Rajasthan)
Goaria
Godwari (गोद्वाली – Godwari)
Balvi
Khuni
Madahaddi
Sirohi
Jogi (spoken by the Jogis in India and Pakistan)
Loarki/Gade Lohar
Unclassified
Bagri / Bagari (बागड़ी – Bagri) (spoken mainly in Bagar tract, Rajasthan, India)
Gujari / Gurjari / Gojri (ગુજરી – गुजरी – گُوجَری – Gujari) (spoken by the Gurjars or Gujjars)
Gurgula
Harauti (Haroti / Hadoti) (spoken in the Hadoti region of southeastern Rajasthan)
Lambadi / Lamani / Gor-Bol / Banjari (spoken by the Banjara)
Banjari of Maharashtra
Banjari of Karnataka
Banjari of Tamil Nadu
Banjari of Telangana
Malvi / Malwi / Malavi (spoken in the Malwa region of India)
Ujjaini (Ujjain, Indore, Dewas, Shajapur, Sehore districts)
Rajawadi (Ratlam, Mandsaur, Neemuch districts)
Umathwadi (Rajgarh district)
Sondhwadi (Jhalawar district)
Rangri
Nimadi / Nimari (closely related to Malvi)
Gujarati
Old Gujarati (extinct)
Middle Gujarati (extinct)
Gujarati (Gujarati Proper) (ગુજરાતી – Gujarātī)
Standard Gujarati
Gamadia
Kathiawari
Kharwa
Kakari
Tarimuki (Ghisadi)
Parsi Gujarati (Zoroastrian Gujarati)
Lisan ud-Dawat (Muslim Gujarati, spoken by the Bohra)
Jandavra / Jhandoria
Vaghri / Waghri / Baghri
Aer (closer to Koli)
Jikrio Goth Aer
Jamesabad Aer
Koli
Parkari Koli
Kachi Koli
Wardiyara Koli / Tharadari
Sauraseni Prakrit (Śaurasenī Prākṛt) (extinct)
Saurashtra (spoken by the Saurashtra Brahmins or Saurashtrians of South India in the states of Karnataka, Kerala, Tamil Nadu and Andhra Pradesh)
Northern Saurashtra
Southern Saurashtra
Vasavi / Vasavi Bhil (a Gujarati language spoken by the Bhil people)
Ambodiya
Dhogri (Dungri)
Khataliya
Kot (Kotne)
Dehvaliya (Kolch)
Bhil
Gamit
Northern Bhil
Bauria-Vaghri-Wagdi
Bauria
Vaghri / Bavri
Wagdi
Aspur
Kherwara
Sagwara Wagadi
Adivasi Wagdi
Bhilori
Dungra
Noiri
Magari (Magra ki Boli)
Central Bhil
Bhili proper (Bhagoria, Bhilboli) (भीली – Bhili)
Rajput Garasia
Bhilali (Rathawi)
Bhilali proper
Rathawi (Rathwi)
Parya Bhilali
Chodri / Chowdhary
Dhodia-Kukna (spoken by the Dhodia and the Kokna)
Dubli (spoken by the Dubla)
Bareli
Palya Bareli
Pauri Bareli
Rathwi Bareli
Pardhi / Bahelia (spoken by the Phase Pardhi)
Neelishikari
Pittala Bhasha
Takari
Haran Shikari
Kalto ("Nahali") (not to be confused with Nihali, a language isolate)
Khandeshi (खान्देशी / अहिराणी – Khandeshi / Ahirani)
Khandeshi (Khandeshi Proper)
Ahirani (spoken by the Ahir)
Chandwadi (spoken around Chandwad hills)
Nandubari (spoken around Nandurbar)
Jamnerior Tawadi (spoken around Jamner tehsil)
Taptangi (spoken by the side of Tapi, Tapti river)
Dongarangi (spoken by the side of forest Ajanta hills)
Dhanki / Dangri
Domari-Romani
Proto Domari-Romani (extinct)
Domari
Domari ("India and Middle Eastern Gypsy") (دٛومَرِي – דּוֺמָרִי – Dōmʋārī / Dōmʋārī ǧib / Dômarî ĵib) (in scattered communities in India, Central Asia, the Middle East and North Africa)
Dombari (in Northern India and Pakistan)
Dehari (in Haryana)
Orhi (in Uttar Pradesh and Uttarakhand)
Kanjari (in Northern India)
Patharkati (in Northern India and Nepal)
Mirasi (in Northern India, Punjab)
Bedi (in Bangladesh)
Narikurava (in Tamil Nadu)
Lori (in Balochistan)
Mugati (Lyuli) (in Central Asian countries)
Churi-Wali (in Afghanistan)
Kurbati / Ghorbati (in Afghanistan and Iran)
Karachi / Garachi (in Northern Iran and Azerbaijan, Caucasus)
Marashi (in Marash, southeastern Turkey)
Barake (in Syria)
Nawari (in Mesopotamia, Levant, North Africa)
Palestinian Domari (in the old quarters of Jerusalem)
Helebi (in North Africa: Egypt, Libya, Tunisia, Algeria and Morocco)
Halab / Ghajar (in Sudan)
Old Persian Domari (former speakers shifted to a mixed Persian Romani language) (extinct)
Seb Seliyer
Transitional Domari-Romani
Old Lomari / Old Lomavren ("Armenian Gypsy") (former speakers shifted to a mixed Romani-Domari-Armenian language, Lomavren) (extinct)
Romani
Romani ("Anatolian and European Gypsy") (Romani čhib) (see also Para-Romani languages) (in scattered communities in Anatolia/Asia Minor, Europe, North and South America)
Old Persian Romani (former speakers shifted to a mixed Persian Romani language) (extinct)
Balkan Romani (Anatolia-Balkan Romani) (Balkan Gypsy)
Southern Balkan (includes Anatolia) / Balkan I (some speakers shifted to a mixed Romano-Greek language)
Rumelian-Zargari
Rumelian
Zargari (spoken in Zargar region, Abyek district of the Qazvin Province in Iran by the Zargari tribe)
Sepečides Romani (Greek Balkan Romani)
Arli / Arlija
Prizren
Ursari Romani (Erli, Usari)
Sofia Erli
Crimean Romani (Kyrymitika)
Northern Balkan (Zis)/Balkan II (some speakers shifted to a mixed Romano-Serbian language)
Dzambazi
Bugurdži
Drindari / Razgrad Drindari (East Bulgarian Romani)
Kalajdži Romani / Pazardžik Kalajdži
Tinners Romani
Ironworker Romani
Paspatian
Vlax Romani (řomani čhib)
Northern Vlax / Vlax I
Kalderash Romani (Coppersmith, Kelderashícko)
Lovari (Lovarícko)
Machvano (Machvanmcko)
Churari (Churarícko, Sievemakers)
Eastern Vlax Romani (Bisa)
Sedentary Romania Romani
Ukraine-Moldavia Romani
Southern Vlax/Vlax II
Serbo-Bosnian Romani
North Albanian Romani
South Albanian Romani
Sedentary Bulgaria Romani
Zagundzi
Grekurja (Greco)
Ghagar
Northern Romani
Carpathian Romani (Central Romani)
Southern Central
Romungro / Romungro Romani
Roman / Roman Romani
Vend / Vend Romani
Gurvari / Gurvari Romani
Northern Central
East Slovak Romani
West Slovak Romani
Old Bohemian Romani (former speakers shifted to a mixed Romani-Czech dialect, Bohemian Romani) (both extinct)
South Polish Romani
Northwestern
Sinte Romani (Sintenghero / Tschib(en) / Sintitikes / Manuš / Romanes)
Serbian Romani dialect
Slovenian-Croatian Romani
Venetian Sinti
Piedmont Sintí
Abbruzzesi Romani
Eftawagaria
Estracharia
Kranaria
Krantiki
Lallere
Praistiki
Gadschkene
Manouche (Manuche, Manush, Manuš)
Welsh-Romani (Kååle) (Romnimus) (probably extinct as a first language)
Old Scottish Romani (former speakers shifted to Scottish Cant language) (extinct)
Old Anglic Romani (former speakers shifted to a mixed Anglo-Romani language) (extinct)
Old Scandinavian Romani (former speakers shifted to a mixed Scandoromani language) (extinct)
Finnish Kalo (Kaalengo tšimb)
Old Caló (former speakers shifted to a mixed Romani-Occitan-Ibero Romance language, Modern Caló, and to a mixed Romani-Basque language, Erromintxela) (extinct)
Northeastern
Baltic Romani
Polish Romani (Polska Romani)
White Russian Romani
Latvian Romani (Lettish Romani) (Lotfika)
Estonian Romani (Čuxny Romani)
North Russian Romani (Xaladitka)
Central Indo-Aryan (Madhya / Hindi) (dialect continuum)
Sauraseni Prakrit (extinct) (spoken mainly in the Madhyadesa region)
Western Hindi (Western Madhyadesi)
North Western Madhyadesi
Hindustani (हिन्दुस्तानी – ہندوستانی)
Dehlavi, Delhi dialect, Kauravi (कौरवी), Vernacular Hindustani, Khari, Khadi, Khadi Boli, Khari Boli (खड़ी बोली – کھڑی بولی), Rekhta, Urdu, Hindi, Hindvi, Deccani (Dakhini) (natively spoken in Delhi, Western Uttar Pradesh and parts of Haryana and Himachal Pradesh states, introduced into the Deccan, scattered and spoken in all India, especially in the Northern Indian states, Hindi Belt) (basis of Modern Standard Hindi and Modern Standard Urdu)
Hindi / Manak or Shuddh Hindi (Sanskritised standard register of the Hindustani language) (हिन्दी – Hindī)
Modern Standard Hindi (High Hindi / Nagari Hindi) (prestige dialect of Hindi and of lingua franca of Northern India)
Delhavi (Delhi Hindi) (spoken in Delhi and outskirts)
Doab Hindi (spoken in the Ganges-Yamuna Doab)
Upper Doab (spoken in Upper Doab)
Middle Doab (spoken in Middle Doab) (overlaps with Braj Bhasha)
Kuttahir / Rohilkhand (spoken in Kuttahir / Rohilkhand) (overlaps with Braj Bhasha and Kannauji)
Mumbai Hindi (Mumbaiya Hindi) (Bombay Hindi) ("Bombay Baat")
Urdu / Lashkari (Persianised standard register of the Hindustani language) (اُردُو – Urdū)
Modern Standard Urdu (prestige dialect of the language spoken in Northern South Asia, especially in cities; contains more Persian and Arabic vocabulary than Dakhni but less than Rekhta; lingua franca of Pakistan)
Punjabi Urdu (Lingua franca spoken in the Pakistani Punjab, including Lahore and Islamabad)
Sindhi Urdu (Link language of urban Sindh, including Karachi and Hyderabad; spoken natively by Muhajirs)
Awadhi Urdu (Spoken in Lucknow and other parts of Central Uttar Pradesh)
Delhavi Urdu (Historically spoken in and around Delhi; still spoken today in parts of Old Delhi)
Bihari Urdu (Spoken in Patna and other parts of Bihar and Jharkhand)
Bhopali Urdu (Spoken in and around Bhopal in Madhya Pradesh)
Dakhini / Dakkhani / Deccani (دکنی – Dakkhani) (fewer Persian and Arabic loans than other Urdu dialects) (an Urdu dialect or a derived language from it) (spoken by the Dakhini Muslims in Central and Southern India)
Hyderabadi Urdu / Northern Dakhni (spoken in regions formerly part of Hyderabad State, including Telangana, Marathwada in Maharashtra and Kalyana-Karnataka in Karanataka)
Southern Dakhni (spoken in parts of central and southern Andhra Pradesh and some communities in northern Tamil Nadu)
Dhakaiya Urdu (endangered minority language historically spoken in Dhaka, Bangladesh)
Rekhta (is a form of Urdu used in poetry)
Sansi-Kabutra
Sansi / Sansiboli / Bhilki
Kabutra
South Western Madhyadesi
Braj-Kannauji
Braj (Braj Bhasha) (Brij Bhasha) (ब्रज भाषा – Braj Bhasha) (spoken in Vraja Bhoomi region)
Kannauji (कन्नौजी – Kannauji) (spoken in the Kannauj region)
Tirhari
Transitional Kannauji
Bundeli / Bundelkhandi (बुन्देली / बुंदेली – Bundeli) (spoken in Bundelkhand)
Standard Bundeli
Northwest Bundeli (similar to Braj Bhasha)
Northeast Bundeli (closely related to Bagheli)
South Bundeli
Unclassified
Bhaya (nearly extinct)
Ghera / Bara
Gowli (spoken by the Gowari)
Haryanvi (हरियाणवी – Hariyāṇvī / हरयाणवी – Harayāṇvī) (mainly spoken in Haryana State)
Bagdi
Bangaru Proper
Deswali / Deshwali
Khadar
Mewati (Haryanvi)
Parya (Парья – Par'ya) (nearly extinct) (an Indo-Aryan language spoken out of the Indian Subcontinent, in the border regions between Tajikistan and Uzbekistan)
Transitional Central-Eastern Indo-Aryan (dialect continuum)
East Central Indo-Aryan languages (Eastern Hindi)
Ardhamagadhi Prakrit (Ardhamāgadhī) (extinct)
Awadhi (Baiswāri / Pūrbī / Kōsalī) (अवधी – Awadhi) (primarily spoken in the Awadh region of present-day Central Uttar Pradesh, Northern India)
Pardesi
Mirzapuri
Gangapari
Uttari
Fiji Hindi (Fijian Hindustani) (फ़िजी बात – Fiji Baat)
Bagheli (Baghelkhandi) (बघेली – Bagheli / बाघेली – Baghelkhandi)
Godwani
Kumhari
Rewa
Surgujia / Sargujia / Surgujia Chhattisgarhi (Northern Chhattisgarhi) / Bhandar
Chhattisgarhi (Kosali, Dakshin Kosali) (छत्तीसगढ़ी / छत्तिसगढ़ी – Chhattisgarhi)
Chhattisgarhi Proper
Kedri (Central) Chhattisgarhi
Budati / Khaltahi (Western) Chhattisgarhi
Utti (Eastern) Chhattisgarhi
Rakshahun (Southern) Chhattisgarhi
Baighani
Bhulia
Binjhwari
Kalanga
Kavardi
Khairagarhi
Sadri Korwa
Eastern Indo-Aryan (dialect continuum)
Magadhi Prakrit (Māgadhī)(extinct) (was spoken in the ancient kingdom of Magadha)
Pali (पालि – Pāḷi) (Paiśācī Prakrit?) (extinct) (liturgical or sacred language of some religious texts of Hinduism and all texts of Theravāda Buddhism)
Apabhramsa Avahatta / Abahatta (অবহট্‌ঠ – Abahaṭ‌ṭha) (extinct)
Bihari languages
Old Bihari
Bhojpuri (भोजपुरी – Bhōjpurī) (spoken in Eastern Uttar Pradesh and Western Bihar)
Northern Bhojpuri (Gorakhpuri, Sarawaria, Basti, Padrauna)
Western Bhojpuri (Purbi, Benarsi)
Southern Bhojpuri (Kharwari)
Nagpuria Bhojpuri (Sadari)
Tharu Bhojpuri
Madheshi Bhojpuri
Domra Bhojpuri
Musahari Bhojpuri
Mauritian Bhojpuri
South African Bhojpuri (Naitali)
Caribbean Hindustani (spoken by the Indo-Caribbeans)
Trinidadian Hindustani (Trinidadian Bhojpuri]] / Plantation Hindustani / Gaon ke Bolee – Village Speech)
Guyanese Hindustani ( Aili Gaili)
Sarnami Hindustani / Sarnami Hindoestani (Suriname Hindustani)
Magadhi (મગહી – मगही – Magahī) (spoken in Central Bihar State)
Khortha (Eastern Magadhi) (could be a Magadhi dialect) (spoken by the Sadan in Jharkhand State)
Maithili (मैथिली – মৈথিলী – Maithilī) (spoken in Mithila, in the states of Bihar and Jharkhand)
Angika (a dialect of Maithili or could be divergent enough to be considered a separate language)
Central Maithili / Madhubani (Sotipura) (basis of the standard form of Maithili)
Thēthi
Jolaha
Kisan
Madhur
Bajjika (a dialect of Maithili or could be divergent enough to be considered a separate language)
Kudmali / Kurmali / Panchpargania / Tamaria (কুর্মালী]] – কুড়মালি]] – Kur(a)mālī) (পঞ্চপরগনিয়া – Panchpargania) (spoken by the Kudumi Mahato)
Mayurbhanja Kurumali
Manbhum Kurmali Thar
Majhi (extinct)
Musasa (spoken predominantly by the Musahar)
Sadri / Sadani / Nagpuri (native language of the Sadan / Sadri)
Oraon Sadri (spoken by part of the Oraon or Kurukh, a Dravidian people, non Indo-European substrate)
Bengali-Assamese languages (বাংলা-অসমীয়া ভাষাসমূহ)
Old Bengali-Assamese/Old Bengali-Kamarupi Prakrit (কামরূপী প্রাকৃত)
Old Bengali
Bengali (বাংলা – Bangla)
Modern Standard Bengali (শুদ্ধ বাংলা – Shuddho Bangla)
Varendri (বরেন্দ্রী – Borendri)
Rarhi (রাঢ়ী) (West Bengal Standard Prestige dialect) (basis of Western Modern Standard Bengali but not identical)
Murshidabadi (মুর্শিদাবাদী)
Maldohiyo (মালদহীয়) (Jongipuri – জঙ্গিপুরী)
Madhya Rādhi (মধ্য রাঢ়ী)
Shadhubasha (সাধুভাষা – Sadhubhasha) (Old Literary Bengali)
Chôlitôbhasha (চলিতভাষা – Chôlitôbhasha / চলতিভাষা – Choltibhasha) (Nadia standard / Shantipuri শান্তিপুরী) (Vernacular based Literary Bengali)
Kolkata dialect (spoken in Kolkata and Kolkata District)
Manbhumi
Birbhumi
Kanthi (Contai)
Sundarbani
Bangali / Vangi
Jessor/Jessoriya (spoken in Jessore District)
Pabnai (spoken in the Pabna District)
Dhakaiya (spoken in Dhaka Division)
Eastern Standard Bengali (use in education throughout Bangladesh)
Dhakaiya Kutti (ঢাকাইয়া কুট্টি) or Puran Dhakaiya (পুরান ঢাকাইয়া) (spoken in Old Dhaka)
Dhakaiya (spoken in Dhaka Division, basis of Eastern Modern Standard Bengali but not identical)
Dobhashi (দোভাষী) (Historical form of Bengali)
Christian Bengali (খ্রীষ্টীয় বাংলা) (Historical form of Bengali)
Mymensinghi (spoken in Mymensingh and Mymensingh Division)
Borishailla (spoken in Barisal Division)
Comillai/Cumillai (spoken in the Comilla District)
Noakhailla (spoken in the Noakhali District)
Sylheti (সিলেটি - Silôṭi) (spoken in the Sylhet region)
Chittagonian / Chattal (Chatgaya / Satgaya) (চাঁটগাঁইয়া]] – Sãṭgãiya) (mainly spoken in Chittagong Division, Southeast Bangladesh)
Rohingya (رُاَࣺينڠَ – Ruáingga) (spoken by the Rohingya people in Rakhine State, far northwest Myanmar, and also in Chittagong Division, far southeast Bangladesh)
Kurmukar
Bishnupriya Manipuri (ইমার ঠার – Imar Thar) (originally confined to the surroundings of the Loktak Lake, Manipur State, Northeast India)
Rajar Gang ("King's village")
Madai Gang ("Queen's village")
Chakma (Changmha Bhach) (spoken by the Chakma and Daingnet people) (has Sino-Tibetan substrate from the Sal branch)
Tangchangya (spoken by the Tanchangya people, Pre-Indo-European substrate)
Hajong (হৃজং ভাশা – Hajong Bhasa) (New Hajong) (Old Hajong was a Tibeto-Burman language, New Hajong is an Indo-Aryan language with Tibeto-Burman roots and substrate)
DoskineKorebari
Susung'yeBarohajaryeMiespe'ryeKharia Thar (spoken by a quarter of the Kharia people) (Kharia substrate)
Lodhi (?) (there could be an Indo-Aryan language with the same name as Lodhi, a Munda Austroasiatic language)
Kamarupi Prakrit / Kamrupi Apabhramsa (spoken in Kamarupa Kingdom) (extinct)
West Kamarupa (Kamata) (KRNB lects – Kamta, Rajbanshi and Northern Bangla lects)Surjapuri / Surajpuri (mainly spoken in the parts of Purnia division, east Bihar, east India)DhekriRangpuriya / Rangpuri / Rajbanshi / Rajbangsi / Kamtapuri / Deshi Bhasha / UzaniKamtapuri (Western Rajbanshi)
Rajbanshi (Central Rajbanshi)
Rangpuri (Eastern Rajbanshi)
East Kamarupa (Asamiya)
Old AssameseAssamese (Asamiya / 'Ôxômiya')
Standard Assamese
Bhakatiya
Goalpariya
Kamrupi/Kamarupi
Central group
Eastern group (Standard Assamese is based on the Eastern group)
Odia languages (Oriya)
Old Odia (spoken in Utkala Kingdom, located in the northern and eastern portion of the modern-day Indian state of Odisha)
Early Middle Odia
Middle Odia
Late Middle Odia
Odia proper (Modern Odia) (ଓଡ଼ିଆ – Oṛiā / Odia)
Spoken Standard Odia
Literary standard of Odia
Midnapori Odia (spoken in the undivided Midnapore and Bankura Districts of West Bengal)
Singhbhumi Odia (spoken in East Singhbhum, West Singhbhum and Saraikela-Kharsawan district of Jharkhand)
Baleswari Odia (spoken in Baleswar, Bhadrak and Mayurbhanj district of Odisha)
Cuttaki Odia (spoken in Cuttack, Jajpur, Jagatsinghpur and Kendrapara district of Odisha)
Puri Odia (spoken in Puri district of Odisha)
Ganjami Odia (spoken in Ganjam and Gajapati districts of Odisha and Srikakulam district of Andhra Pradesh)
Phulbani Odia (spoken in Phulbani, Phulbani Town, Khajuripada block of Kandhamal, and in nearby areas bordering Boudh district)
Sundargadi Odia (variation of Odia Spoken in Sundargarh district of Odisha and in adjoining pockets of Jharkhand and Chhattisgarh)
Kalahandia Odia (variation of Odia spoken in undivided Kalahandi District and neighboring districts of Chhattisgarh)
Kurmi (spoken in Northern Odisha and South west Bengal)
Sounti (spoken in Northern Odisha and South west Bengal) (spoken by the Sounti)
Bathudi (spoken in Northern Odisha and South west Bengal by the Bathudi)
Kondhan (a tribal dialect spoken in Western Odisha)
Laria (spoken in bordering areas of Chatishgarh and Western Odisha)
Aghria / Agharia (spoken mostly by the Agharia or Aghria caste in Western Odisha)
Bhulia (spoken in Western part of Odisha by Bhulia or Weaver community)
Adivasi Oriya / Adivasi Odia
Bodo Parja / Jharia (tribal dialect of Odia spoken mostly in Koraput district of Southern Odisha)
Desiya Odia or Koraputia Odia (spoken in Koraput, Kalahandi, Rayagada, Nabarangapur and Malkangiri Districts of Odisha and in the hilly regions of Vishakhapatnam, Vizianagaram District of Andhra Pradesh)
Sambalpuri / Western Odia (Kosali) (spoken in western Odisha, East India, in Bargarh, Bolangir, Boudh, Debagarh, Nuapada, Sambalpur, Subarnapur districts of Odisha and in Raigarh, Mahasamund, Raipur districts of Chhattisgarh state) (it is not to be confused with "Kosali", a term sometimes also used for Awadhi and related languages)
Reli / Relli (spoken in Southern Odisha and bordering areas of Andhra Pradesh)
Kupia (spoken by the Valmiki caste people in the Indian state of Telangana and Andhra Pradesh, mostly in Hyderabad, Mahabubnagar, Srikakulam, Vizianagaram, East Godavari and Visakhapatnam districts)
Transitional Eastern-Southern Indo-Aryan (dialect continuum)
Halbic
Halbi (Bastari, Halba, Halvas) (ହଲବୀ – हलबी – Halbi) (spoken in undivided Bastar district of Chhattisgarh, transitional between Odia and Marathi)
Mehari
Bhunjia
Bhatri (spoken in South-western Odisha and eastern-south Chhattisgarh)
Kamar
Mirgan/Panika
Nahari (not to be confused with Nahali language)
Southern Indo-Aryan (dialect continuum)
Maharashtri Prakrit (महाराष्ट्री प्राकृत – Mahārāṣṭri Prākṛt) (extinct)
Marathi–Konkani languages
Marathi (मराठी – Marāṭhī)
Standard Marathi
Zadi Boli/Zhadiboli (spoken in eastern Vidarbha region of Maharashtra, Eastern Maharashtra)
Varhadi/Varhadi-Nagpuri (spoken in western Vidarbha region of Maharashtra, Eastern Maharashtra)
Nagpuri
Desi (spoken in Western Maharashtra)
Mumbai Marathi / East Indian language
Southern Indian Marathi (spoken by many descendants of Maharashtrians who migrated to Southern India)
Thanjavur Marathi
Namadeva Shimpi Marathi
Arey Marathi
Bhavsar Marathi
Judeo-Marathi (spoken by the Bene Israel – Marathi Jews)
Konkani (spoken along Konkan Coast and Northern Malabar Coast)
Kadodi (Samvedi, Samavedi) (spoken by the Samvedi Brahmin and Kupari community in Vasai, Maharashtra, India)
Katkari / Kathodi (spoken by the Katkari people)
Varli / Warli (वारली – Varli/Warli) (spoken by the Warli / Varli people)
Phudagi / Vadvali (फुडगी – Phudagi / वाडवळी – Vadvali)
Maharashtrian Konkani / Maharashtrian Kokani (महाराष्ट्रीय कोंकणी – Maharashtri Konkani / महाराष्ट्रीय कोकणी – Maharashtri Kokani]])
Parabhi
Koli (spoken by the Koli or fishermen community found in Mumbai, Thane, Palghar and Raigad district of Maharashtra)
Kiristanv
Kunbi
Agri/Agari (spoken by the Agri people)
Dhangari
Thakri/Thakuri (spoken by the Adivasi and katkari community found in Raigad district of Maharashtra) (non-Marathi substratum)
Karadhi
Sangameshwari
Bankoti
Maoli
Konkani (Goan Konkani) (कोंकणी – Kōṅkaṇī)
Goan Konkani Proper
Mangalorean Konkani
Chitpavani Konkani
Malvani Konkani
Karwari Konkani
Kukna (Canarese Konkani) (कॅनराचॆं कोंकणी – Kanarachem Konkani)
Saraswat dialects (आमचीगॆलॆं – āmcigelẽ)
Travancore Konkani (Kerala Konkani) (including parts of Kochi / Cochin) (कॊच्चिमांय – Koccimā̃y)
Sinhalese-Maldivian languages (Insular Indo-Aryan)
Sinhalese Prakrit (Elu / Helu / Hela) (Eḷu / Sīhala) (extinct)
Proto-Sinhala (3rd–7th century CE)
Medieval Sinhala (7th–12th century CE)
Sinhala (Modern Sinhala) (සිංහල – 'Siṁhala')
Uva (Monaragala, Badulla)
Southern (Galle)
Uppland Country (Kandy)
Sabaragamu (Kegalle)
Maldivian (Dhivehi) (ދިވެހި – Dhivehi / ދިވެހިބަސް – Dhivehi-bas) (spoken in the Maldives and also in the Union Territory of Lakshadweep, southwest India and in Minicoy Island, southwest India)
Maliku Bas (Mahl) (spoken in Minicoy)
Haddhunmathee Bas (spoken in Haddhunmathi / Laamu)
Malé Bas (basis of Standard Maldivian)
Mulaku Bas (spoken in Fuvahmulah)
Madifushi Bas (spoken in Kolhumadulu)
Huvadhu Bas (spoken in Huvadhu)
Addu Bas (spoken in Addu)
Unclassified
Andh / Andhi (spoken by the Andh)
Chinali-Lahul Lohar (spoken in Lahaul and Spiti district, in northern Himachal Pradesh, northern India)
Chinali
Lahul Lohar
Kanjari (it may be one of the Punjabi languages)
Kholosi (spoken in two villages in southern Iran)
Kumhali / Kumbale (moribund Indic language of Nepal)
Kuswaric (spoken in Nepal)
Danwar / Danuwar
Bote-Darai
Bote
Darai
Dewas Rai (it is not related to the Rai languages of the Tibeto-Burman family)
Od (Oadki) (it has similarities to Marathi, with features also shared with Gujarati) (spoken by the Orh in Gujarat, Haryana, Rajasthan, New Delhi, Sindh, and the south of Punjab)
Tharu (थारु – Tharu) (not only one language) (pre-Indo-European, pre-Dravidian and pre-Sino-Tibetan substrate of an unknown language or languages of a possible indigenous language family) (mainly in the Terai)
Dangaura-Rana-Buksa
Dangaura Tharu
Rana Tharu
Buksa Tharu/Bhoksa Tharu (spoken by the Bhoksa people)
Sonha
Kathoria Tharu
Kochila Tharu
Chitwania Tharu
Savji language (Saoji / Souji / Sauji) (Savji bhasha / Khatri bhasha)
Vaagri Booli / Hakkipikki

Unclassified Indo-European languages (all extinct)
Indo-European languages whose relationship to other languages in the family is unclear
Armeno-Phrygian?
Brygo-Phrygian
Brygian (part of or closely related to Phrygian language and possibly also related to Greek, Phrygian speakers that stayed in Northern Greece, Southern Illyria and Southern Thrace)
Phrygian (may have been more closely related to Greek, also a possible ancestor of Armenian, East Phrygians or Mysians (Eastern Mushki) may have spoken a language that was Proto-Armenian, ancestor of Armenian)
Moesian-Mysian?
Moesian (possibly related to Mysian and to Dacian, related to Brygian, spoken by the Bryges, and Phrygian)
Mysian? – possibly related to Moesian, an Anatolian/Asia Minor branch of Moesian, and to Dacian, related to Phrygian with an Anatolian substrate closer to Lydian) (also may have been an Anatolian Indo-European language). Mysians may have been the same as the Mushki (western and eastern branches) and their language also, if that was the case, then their language may have been related to or an ancestor of Proto-Armenian (Eastern Mushki may have been identical with Proto-Armenian).
Mushkian
Western Mushkian (identical with Mysian?)
Eastern Mushkian (identical with Proto-Armenian?)
Mygdonian? (language of the Mygdonians)
Paionian (possibly related to Phrygian, Thracian, Illyrian, or Anatolian)
Belgic/Ancient Belgian (part of Celtic, related to Celtic, Italic, or part of the Nordwestblock) (possibly part of an older Pre-Celtic Indo-European branch)
Cimmerian (possibly related to Iranian or Thracian)
Dardanian (Illyrian, Dacian, mixed Thracian-Illyrian or a transitional Thracian-Illyrian language)
East Central Asia Indo-European (is a Geographical grouping, not necessarily genealogical) (they may have been Iranian or Tocharian languages)
Asinean / Ossinean-Wusunean (may have been two different variant names for the same language and people)
Assinean / Ossinean (Ancient language of the steppe, spoken by the Asii) (Assinean or Ossinean and Wusunean may have been two different variant names for the same language and people)
Wusunean (it was spoken by the Wusun, *ʔɑ-suən in Eastern Han Chinese, an ancient Indo-European speaking people, in the Qilian Mountains and Dunhuang, Gansu, near the Yuezhi or in Dunhong, in the Tian Shan) (may have been the same people that was called by the names Issedones and Asii, *ʔɑ-suən in Eastern Han Chinese, and they possibly were an Iranian people or a Tocharian people)
Gushiean-Yuezhiean (may have been two different variant names for the same language and people which for some time dwelt in several regions of modern eastern Xinjiang and western Gansu)
Gushiean (Language of an obscure ancient people on the Turpan Basin, known as the Gushi or Jushi of the Gushi or Jushi Kingdom. It eventually diverged into two dialects, as noted by diplomats from the Han empire) (it may have been an Iranian language, which overlapped with or replaced the "Tocharian A" language, or a Tocharian language)
Nearer Gushiean / Anterior Gushiean, in the Turpan Basin southern area
Further Gushiean / Posterior Gushiean, in the Turpan Basin northern area
Yuezhiean (it was spoken by the Yuezhi, an ancient Indo-European speaking people, in the western areas of the modern Chinese province of Gansu, during the 1st millennium BC, or in Dunhong, in the Tian Shan, later they migrated westward and southward into south Central Asia, in contact and conflict with the Sogdians and Bactrians, and they possibly were the people called by the name "Tocharians", which was possibly a Tocharian or an Iranian speaking people)
Greater-Yuezhiean (Dà Yuèzhī – 大月氏) (dialect ancestral to the hypothetical Kushanite language spoken in Kushana). Possibly this language was spoken by an Iranian or Tocharian people (possibly they were the ancestors of the Kushans)
Kushanite (language of the Kushans (Chinese: 貴霜; pinyin: Guìshuāng), the people which formed the Kushan Empire)
Lesser-Yuezhiean (Xiǎo Yuèzhī – 小月氏)
Ligurian language (ancient) (possibly related to Italic or Celtic)
Lusitanian (part of Celtic, related to Celtic, Ligurian, Italic, Nordwestblock, or his own branch) (possibly part of an older Pre-Celtic Indo-European branch)
Paleo-Balkan languages (is a Geographical grouping, not genealogical)
Daco-Thracian
Geto-Dacian
Dacian (possibly related to Thracian)
Getaean Language (Transitional Thracian Dacian language spoken by the Getae)
Moesian Language (Dialect of Dacian possibly spoken by the Moesi or a language related to Mysian)?
Thracian (possibly related to Dacian)
Illyrian-Messapian
Illyrian languages (one is a possible ancestor of Albanian)
Messapian (possibly related to Illyrian languages, spoken in today's Apulia, Italy, but possibly originated in Dalmatia, Western Balkans)
Venetic-Liburnian (either Italic or closely related to Italic)
Venetic (either Italic or closely related to Italic)
Liburnian (possibly related to Venetic)

Possible Indo-European languages (all extinct)
Unclassified languages that may have been Indo-European or members of other language families (?)
Cypro-Minoan
Elymian
Eteocypriot
Hunnic-Xiongnu language or languages (possibly the same or part of the same)
Hunnic (possibly part, related or descend from the older language of the Xiongnu) – there is a hypothesis that endorses the possibly that Hunnic belonged to the Scythian branch of Iranic language group (other hypotheses uphold Hunnic was a Turkic or Yenisean language) (Huns were a tribal confederation of different peoples and tribes, not necessarily of the same origin, because of that, even if not the most, there may have been an Indo-European linguistic element)
Xiongnu (Huns may have been related, part of them or descend from them) – spoken by the Xiongnu tribes in Central Mongolia and northeast China (other hypotheses uphold Xiongnu language was a Turkic or Yenisean language) (Xiongnu were a tribal confederation of different peoples and tribes, not necessarily of the same origin, because of that, even if not the most, there may have been an Indo-European linguistic element)
Minoan
Eteocretan
Paleo-Corsican – unattested, only inferred from toponymic evidence.
Paleo-Sardinian – unattested, only inferred from toponymic evidence and a presumed substratum in Sardinian.
Philistine – spoken by Philistines in coastal Canaan, mainly in the southwest coast, it may have been an Anatolian, Hellenic or Illyrian language.
Tartessian – part of Celtic, Pre-Celtic Indo-European, Anatolian, a divergent branch of Indo-European or an Indo-European related language family?
Trojan – spoken in Troy (Wilusa as the city was known by the Hittites) and the Troad (Taruiša as the region was known by the Hittites), may have been Luwian (an Anatolian language) or Greek (a Hellenic language), all the former languages were members of branches part of the Indo-European language family; or an Etruscan language (Non-Indo-European language, possibly part of the Tyrsenian language family).

Hypothetical Indo-European languages (all extinct)

Eastern Corded Ware culture language or languages
Middle Dnieper Culture language or languages (possibly a common ancestor and a link between the Balto-Slavic and Indo-Iranian languages) (has been viewed as a contact zone between Yamnaya steppe tribes and occupants of the forest steppe zone)
Fatyanovo–Balanovo culture language or languages (has been associated with a pre-Balto-Slavic (or pre-Balto-Slavic–Germanic) stage in the history of the Indo-European languages)
Poltavka culture language or languages (ancestral to Sintashta Culture, possibly a Pre-Proto-Indo-Iranian language)
Potapovka culture language or languages (possibly Pre-Proto-Indo-Iranian)
Srubnaya culture language or languages (generally associated with archaic Iranian speakers)
Abashevo culture language or languages (directly ancestral to Pre-Proto-Indo-Iranian or already Proto-Indo-Iranian)
Sintashta Culture language (Proto-Indo-Iranian) (It is widely regarded as the origin of the Indo-Iranian languages)
Andronovo culture language or languages - most researchers associate the Andronovo horizon with early Indo-Iranian languages.
Euphratic – a hypothetical ancient Indo-European language spoken in the Euphrates river course that may have been the substrate language of later Semitic languages.
Ordos culture language – located in modern Inner Mongolia autonomous region, China.This culture may reflect the easternmost extension of an Indo-European ethnolinguistic group, possibly Iranian under the form of Sakans or Scythians, or Tocharian (One other possibility is that they were the Xiongnu people).
Qiang language (of the ancient Qiang people) – spoken by the historical Qiang people in parts of the northeastern and eastern Tibetan Plateau, modern China.

See also
List of Pidgins, Creoles, Mixed languages and Cants based on Indo-European languages
Proto-Human
Borean languages
Nostratic
Eurasiatic
Uralo-Siberian
Indo-Uralic
Indo-Anatolian (Indo-Hittite)
Paleo-Balkan
Daco-Thracian
Graeco-Armenian
Graeco-Aryan
Graeco-Phrygian
Thraco-Illyrian
Italo-Celtic

References

External links
Indo-European language tree

 
 
Indo-European